= Punctelia borrerina =

Scientific classification
- Domain: Eukaryota
- Kingdom: Fungi
- Division: Ascomycota
- Class: Lecanoromycetes
- Order: Lecanorales
- Family: Parmeliaceae
- Genus: Punctelia
- Species: P. borrerina

Binomial name
- Punctelia borrerina (Nyl.) Krog (1982)

Synonyms
- Parmelia borrerina Nyl. (1896); Punctelia borreri var. allophylla Kremp.

Species of lichen

Punctelia borrerina is a species of foliose lichen in the family Parmeliaceae. It is found in Mexico and South America.

== Taxonomy ==
The lichen was first formally described as Parmelia borrerina by Finnish botanist William Nylander in 1896. The type specimens were collected in Rio Grande do Sul, Brazil. Nylander described the species as somewhat similar to Parmelia borreri (now the type species of Punctelia), but with different chemistry: in P. borrerina, the medulla has C− and KC− spot test reactions, while P. borreri is C+. Hildur Krog transferred Parmelia borrerina to the new genus Punctelia in 1982. Punctelia borreri var. allophylla is considered to be a synonym of P. borrerina.

== Description ==
Punctelia borrerina produces ascospores that are less than 20 μm long, and long-filiform (threadlike) conidia that are typically 10–15 μm long.

The lichen is a member of the Punctelia microsticta group, a set of similar species with a black thallus undersurface and lacking vegetative propagules; the other members of this group are P. jujensis, P. microsticta, P. riograndensis, and P. subpraesignis.

== Distribution ==
In addition to Brazil, Punctelia borrerina has also been reported in Argentina and Uruguay. In Mexico, it has been found in San Luis Potosí, Tamaulipas, and Veracruz.
