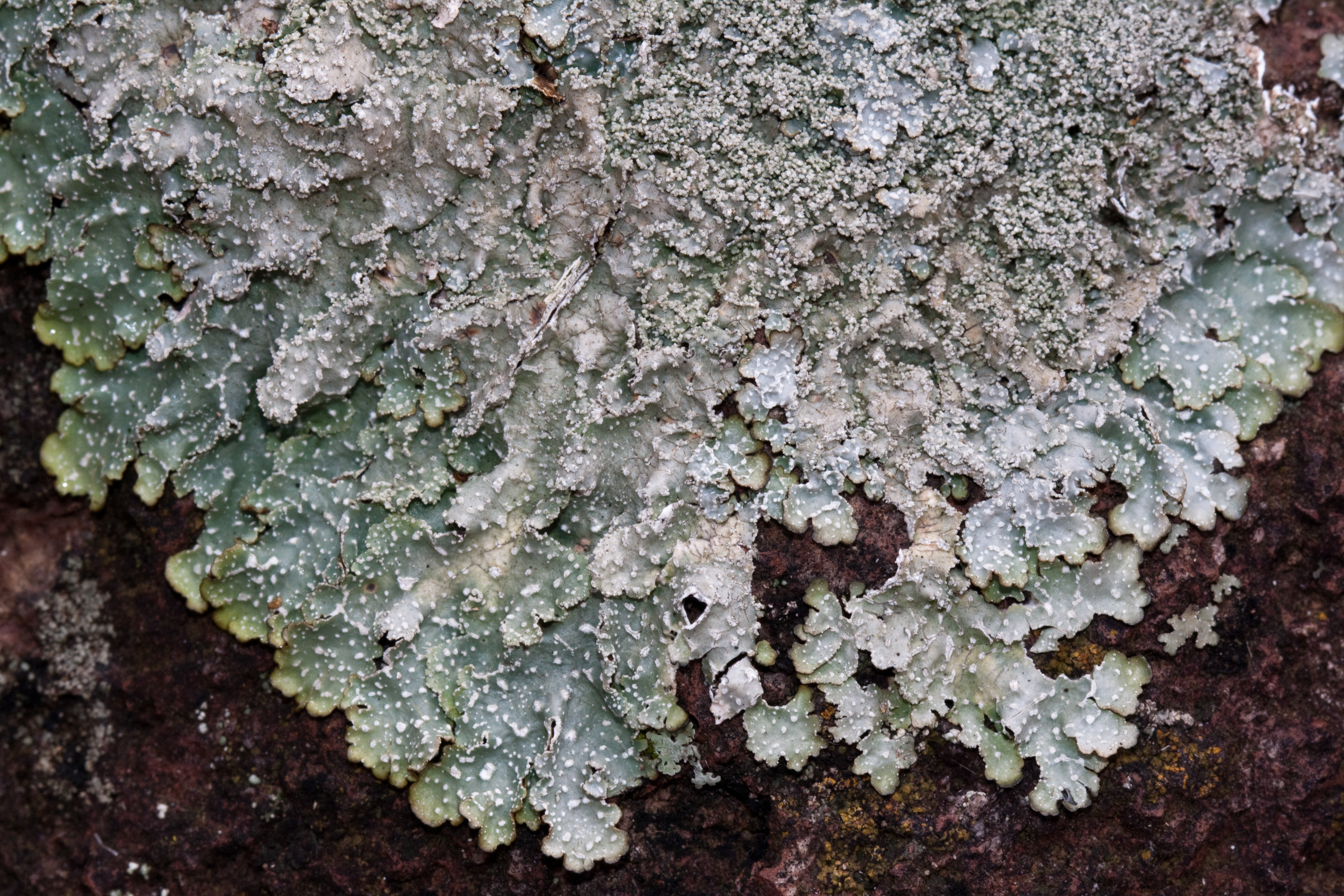

Conservation status
- Apparently Secure (NatureServe)

Scientific classification
- Kingdom: Fungi
- Division: Ascomycota
- Class: Lecanoromycetes
- Order: Lecanorales
- Family: Parmeliaceae
- Genus: Punctelia
- Species: P. stictica

Binomial name
- Punctelia stictica (Delise ex Duby) Krog (1982)

Synonyms
- Parmelia borreri var. stictica Delise ex Duby (1830); Imbricaria borreri var. stictica (Delise ex Duby) Flot. (1850); Parmelia dubia var. stictica (Duby) Schaer. (1850); Parmelia stictica (Delise ex Duby) Nyl. (1872); Parmotrema sticticum (Delise ex Duby) M.Choisy (1952)

= Punctelia stictica =

Species of lichen

Punctelia stictica is a species of foliose lichen in the family Parmeliaceae. It is widely distributed lichen, recorded in Africa, Europe, North America, South America, and Greenland. It is typically found growing on rocks.

== Taxonomy ==
The lichen was first formally described by French botanist and lichenologist Dominique François Delise in 1830, as a variety of Parmelia borreri (the type species of genus Punctelia). Hildur Krog promoted it to species status when she transferred it to the then-newly circumscribed genus Punctelia in 1982.

Molecular phylogenetic analysis has shown that it is in one of five major clades in Punctelia, which contains species that produce gyrophoric acid as their main secondary metabolite. This clade also includes Punctelia borreri, Punctelia subpraesignis, and Punctelia reddenda.

In 2020, after a study of the Argentinian type material of Vilmos Kofarago-Gyelnik, Juan Rodriguez and Edith Filippini proposed that Parmelia maculoides Gyeln. should be considered a synonym of Punctelia stictica.

== Description ==
Punctelia stictica has a light to dark brown upper thallus surface, covered with secondarily sorediate pseudocyphellae, and soredia that are granular to isidioid (somewhat resembling isidia, often darkened and solid looking, but with a cortex and typically arising from distinct soralia). The thallus underside is brown, darkening to black towards the centre. The lichen contains gyrophoric acid as the major medullary metabolite in the medulla, and conidia that are long and filiform (threadlike).

A 1996 study compared the morphological and chemical differences between Punctelia stictica and Punctelia colombiana (another species with filiform conidia), concluding that the species are closely related but distinct, and are possibly derived from Punctelia jujensis.

== Habitat and distribution ==
Punctelia stictica is a widely distributed species. It has an antitropical distribution–a type of disjunct distribution where it occurs at comparable latitudes across the equator but not in the tropics. Although primarily temperate, its range extends into the European boreal zone. In North America, it has been recorded from the United States. In South America, it occurs in Colombia, Ecuador, Venezuela, Argentina, and Chile; it is very common in Patagonian steppe areas. In Europe it is known from France and Norway. In Africa, specimens have been collected from Ethiopia and Lesotho. It has also been found in west Greenland. The lichen is usually found growing on rocks, and infrequently on bark or on the ground.
