= Punctelia microsticta =

Scientific classification
- Domain: Eukaryota
- Kingdom: Fungi
- Division: Ascomycota
- Class: Lecanoromycetes
- Order: Lecanorales
- Family: Parmeliaceae
- Genus: Punctelia
- Species: P. microsticta

Binomial name
- Punctelia microsticta (Müll.Arg.) Krog (1982)

Synonyms
- Parmelia microsticta Müll.Arg. (1879)

Species of lichen

Punctelia microsticta is a species of foliose lichen in the family Parmeliaceae. It occurs in Brazil and Argentina, where it grows on bark.

== Taxonomy ==
The lichen was first described to science in 1879 by Swiss botanist Johannes Müller Argoviensis as Parmelia microsticta. The type specimen was collected from Apiaí (São Paulo, Brazil), by botanist Juan Ignacio Puiggari. He found it growing on the trunk of lemon tree (Citrus limon). The original description noted its similarity to Punctelia rudecta, with differences in the grey colour of the thallus, the pale apothecia, and the much larger spores. Hildur Krog transferred it to the newly circumscribed genus Punctelia in 1982.

Punctelia species with a black lower thallus surface and lacking vegetative propagules (like isidia or soredia) are called the Punctelia microsticta group. This complex of morphologically similar species includes P. borrerina, P. riograndensis, P. jujensis, and P. subpraesignis; all occur in South America.

== Description ==
Punctelia microsticta has ascospores that are greater than 20 μm long (those of the type are most typically in the range 22–26 by 14–18 μm), hook-like (unciform) conidia, and has negative medullary chemical reactions for C and KC. This combination of features distinguishes it from other species of the P. microsticta species complex.

== Habitat and distribution ==
In addition to Brazil, Punctelia microsticta has been recorded from Argentina. In an assessment of the potential use of local lichens as air quality biomonitors in central Argentina, Punctelia microsticta was determined to be a pollution-tolerant species. Although the lichen typically occurs on the bark of trees and shrubs, one report from Argentina noted its growth on the painted metal bars of the "La Postrera", an iron bridge on Provincial Route 2.

== Chemistry ==
Secondary compounds that have been found in Punctelia microsticta include isomuronic acid, gyrophoric acid and dihydropertusaric acid.
