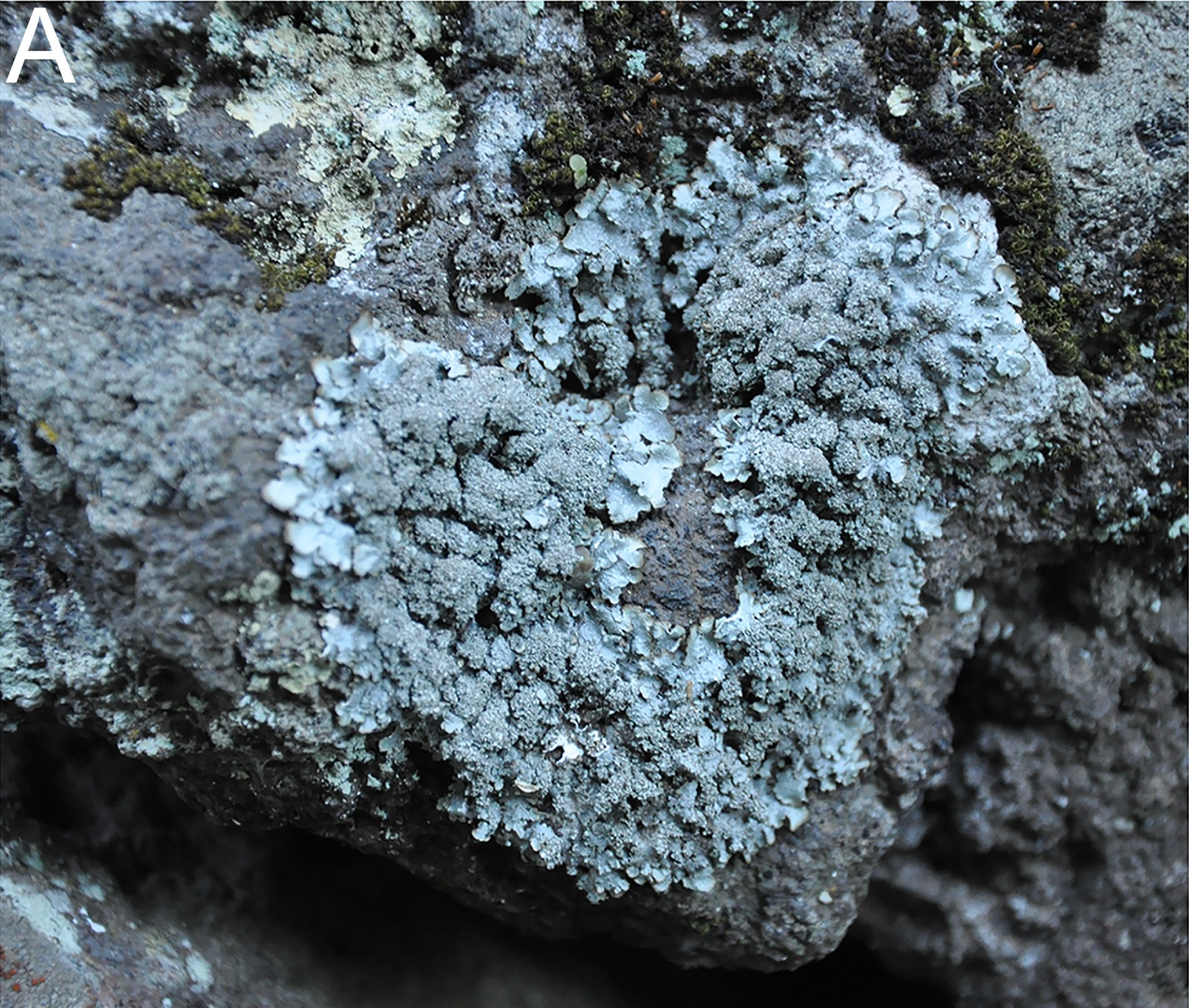
- In habitat in the Canary Islands

Scientific classification
- Kingdom: Fungi
- Division: Ascomycota
- Class: Lecanoromycetes
- Order: Lecanorales
- Family: Parmeliaceae
- Genus: Punctelia
- Species: P. guanchica

Binomial name
- Punctelia guanchica Alors, A.Crespo & Divakar (2016)

= Punctelia guanchica =

Species of lichen in the family Parmeliaceae

Punctelia guanchica is a species of foliose lichen in the family Parmeliaceae that is only known from the Canary Islands. It is similar in appearance and morphology to the North American Punctelia rudecta, and was historically misidentified as that species until molecular phylogenetic evidence showed it to be a distinct species. It differs in having thicker isidia that develop from the centre of the pseudocyphellae, and it mainly grows on rocks.

== Taxonomy ==
The lichen was formally described in 2016 as a new species by David Alors, Ana Crespo, and Pradeep Kumar Divakar. In an attempt to understand the Punctelia rudecta species complex, the authors analysed the DNA of that species collected from various locations throughout its supposedly wide distribution. Five clades were identified in the analysis, indicating that five cryptic species were all being called Punctelia rudecta. Within clade "A", the "P. rudecta group", is a clade with specimens of P. rudecta (in the broad sense) from the Canary Islands, which is sister to a clade that consists of North American P. rudecta specimens. The North American clade kept their original name (the original type of P. rudecta was from North America), while the Canary Island clade was described as new and called P. guanchica. The type of P. guanchica was collected in La Laguna (Tenerife), where it was growing at an altitude of 613 m (2,000 ft), on vertical basaltic rock.

The specific epithet guanchica refers to the aboriginal inhabitants of the Canary Islands, known as the Guanches.

== Description ==
The thallus of Punctelia guanchica is foliose, measuring 3–4 cm (1.2–1.6 in) across, and is closely attached to its substrate. The lobes comprising the thallus are rotund, 2–4 mm (0.08–0.16 in) wide, with entire margins. The upper surface of the thallus is whitish grey, often bordered by a narrow, brown margin. It has a network-like (reticulate) pattern of wrinkles near the margin of lobes, and has pseudocyphellae and isidia. The pseudocyphellae are laminal (superficial on the surface), point-like (punctiform) to elongated, and up to 0.5 mm in size. They are more distinct near the periphery of the lobes. The isidia are laminal, and develop from the centre of pseudocyphellae. They are thick, short, and up to 0.5 mm tall. With a branching pattern that ranges from simple to coral-like, they occur in groups, and are rarely flattened in the centre of thallus. The medulla is white. The lower surface is white with a pale margin. The rhizines, which are about 1 mm long, are simple (i.e., unbranched), and the same colour as the lower surface. The photobiont partner is a trebouxioid green alga. Apothecia and conidia have not been observed in this species.

Some standard lichen spot tests can be used to help confirm the identify of Punctelia guanchica. The cortex is K+ yellow; the medulla is K−, C+ rose, KC+ red, and PD−. These test indicate the presence of the secondary chemicals atranorin and lecanoric acid.

=== Similar species ===
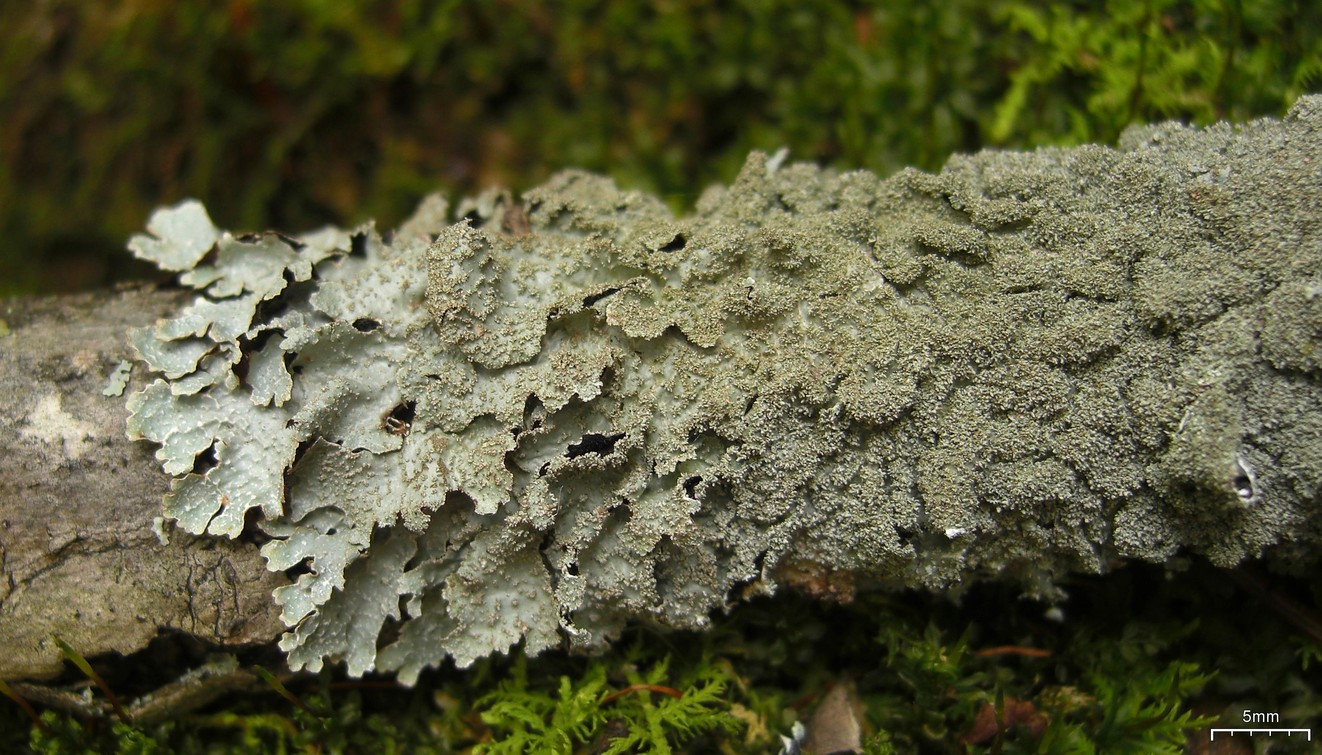
Punctelia rudecta

Because of their similarity, Punctelia guanchica can readily be confused with P. rudecta, which is known colloquially as the "rough speckled shield lichen". This species occurs in North America and differs in having isidia developing from the periphery of pseudocyphellae, and mainly grows on bark. In contrast, P. guanchica is only known from Canary Islands and grows on rocky substrates. Another lookalike is the South African-endemic P. toxodes. P. guanchica is also similar to P. ruderata, but it occurs in Asia and East Africa.
