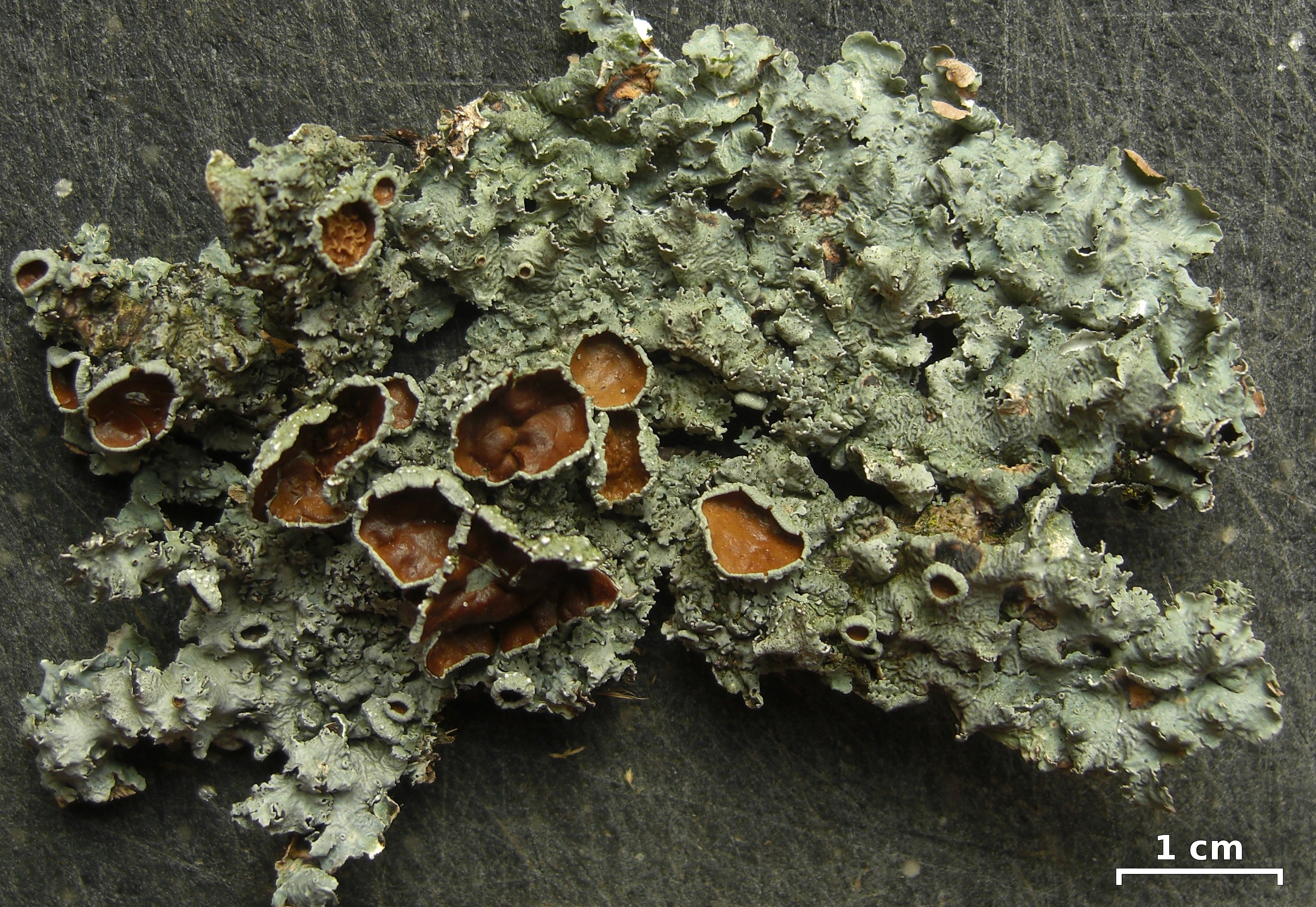
- Specimen collected from Observatory Hill State Natural Area, Wisconsin, USA

Conservation status
- Apparently Secure (NatureServe)

Scientific classification
- Kingdom: Fungi
- Division: Ascomycota
- Class: Lecanoromycetes
- Order: Lecanorales
- Family: Parmeliaceae
- Genus: Punctelia
- Species: P. bolliana

Binomial name
- Punctelia bolliana (Müll.Arg.) Krog (1982)

Synonyms
- Parmelia bolliana Müll.Arg. (1877)

= Punctelia bolliana =

Species of lichen

Punctelia bolliana, the eastern speckled shield lichen, is a species of foliose lichen in the family Parmeliaceae. It is found in North America, with a distribution extending from the Canadian province of Ontario south to the central and northeastern United States and Mexico. It grows on the bark of both deciduous trees and coniferous trees. The combination of characteristics that distinguishes this species from others in genus Punctelia are the absence of the vegetative propagules isidia and soralia, a pale brown lower thallus surface, and the presence of the secondary chemical protolichesterinic acid in the medulla.

== Taxonomy ==
The lichen was first formally described as Parmelia bolliana by Swiss lichenologist Johannes Müller Argoviensis in 1877. The type specimen was collected in Van Zandt County, Texas. In 1982 Norwegian botanist Hildur Krog transferred it to Punctelia, a genus she circumscribed to contain Parmelia species with point-like (punctate) pseudocyphellae. In North America it is known colloquially as the "eastern speckled shield lichen".

== Description ==
Punctelia bolliana has a bluish-grey thallus comprising lobes measuring 2–6 mm (0.08–0.24 in) wide. The surface of the thallus tends to become folded and wrinkled with age, and it develops small lobes (lobules) on its edges and surface. Isidia and soralia are absent; the lobules are thought to function as a vegetative propagule, although they are noted to be "robust and not easily fragmenting". The thallus underside is pale tan, with pale rhizines. Apothecia are often abundant (although in some instances they are absent; see below); they measure 3–15 mm (0.1–0.6 in) in diameter, with convex or convoluted brown discs. Pycnidia are usually abundant; they appear as tiny light brown to black dots on the surface. The medulla is white and has a continuous algal layer. The presence of both the lobules and apothecia is quite variable, Egan and Lendemer have suggested "the abundance of one appears to be somewhat inversely proportional to the abundance of the other". The ascospores of this species are translucent, more or less ellipsoid in shape, and measure 11–15 by 5–9 μm. The conidia are short with a rod-like shape, measuring 4–5 μm long.

Standard chemical spot tests can be used to help identify Punctelia bolliana, or to distinguish it from other Punctelia species. In the medulla, these results are PD−, K−, KC−, and C−; in the upper cortex, they are K+ (yellow), C−, KC−, and P−. The lichen contains the secondary chemicals protolichesterinic acid and lichesterinic acid in the medulla, and atranorin and minor amounts of chloroatranorin in the cortex.

The set of characteristics that define Punctelia bolliana and differentiate it from other members of the genus are: the absence of soralia and isidia; a brown lower thallus surface; fatty acids in the medulla (C−); hook-like (unciform) conidia; and ascospores that measure less than 20 μm. Molecular phylogenetic analysis shows that it is closely related to Punctelia appalachensis, a North American species that also has fatty acids as the main medullary component.

=== Similar species ===
The Brazilian species Punctelia osorioi is quite similar in appearance to Parmelia bolliana. It can be distinguished by the lacinules (vegetative propagules) that rise from the margins of the lobes and the subtle pseudocyphellae (meaning that they can be seen only with concerted effort), which are almost restricted to the amphithecium (the thalline margin of an apothecium) and the tips of the lobules that are rare on the thallus surface. Unlike P. osorioi, which has a smooth or scalloped (never lacinulate) margin, and denser rhizinae that can extend beyond the margins, P. bolliana has lobe margins that are frequently short-lacinulate and has few rhizines on the lower thallus surface. Two other lookalikes are Punctelia hypoleucites and Punctelia semansiana, but they are distinguished from P. bolliana by a C+ (red) reaction indicating the presence of lecanoric acid.

== Habitat and distribution ==
In the United States, Punctelia bolliana is found in the central and northeastern parts of the country, but is absent from most of the southeast. Its distribution extends north into the Canadian province of Ontario. It grows on tree bark in open woodlands. Some tree species upon which the lichen has been recorded are the deciduous species Quercus alba, Quercus macrocarpa, Quercus rubra, Carya ovata, Juglans nigra, Gleditsia triacanthos, and Populus deltoides; it has also been found growing on the conifers Pinus strobus and Pinus sylvestris. Punctelia bolliana has been reported from lichen surveys conducted in the states of Iowa, Wisconsin, Illinois, Nebraska, New York, Minnesota, and Alabama, In 2021, the lichen was reported as new to Connecticut; it is considered to be among the first reported cases of the introduction of lichen in North America through the import of ornamental trees. It is widely distributed in northern and central Mexico, and has also been recorded from cloud forest remnants in Veracruz.
