= Punctelia tomentosula =

Scientific classification
- Domain: Eukaryota
- Kingdom: Fungi
- Division: Ascomycota
- Class: Lecanoromycetes
- Order: Lecanorales
- Family: Parmeliaceae
- Genus: Punctelia
- Species: P. tomentosula

Binomial name
- Punctelia tomentosula Kurok. (1999)

Species of lichen

Punctelia tomentosula is a species of foliose lichen in the family Parmeliaceae. Found in Peru, it was described as a new species in 1999 by Japanese lichenologist Syo Kurokawa.

The lichen has dense, dimorphous rhizines, a medulla that produces a rose colour with a C+ lichen spot test (caused by the presence of lecanoric acid), and short-filiform (threadlike) conidia that measure 7–9 μm long. It has abundant pseudocyphellae and soralia on the thallus surface, and a brown lower surface. Punctelia osorioi, found in South Brazil, is somewhat similar in appearance – particularly the dense rhizines. However, it does not have soralia, it has short, hook-like (unciform) conidia that are shorter than those in P. tomentosula (5−6 μm), and it does not have lecanoric acid in the medulla.
