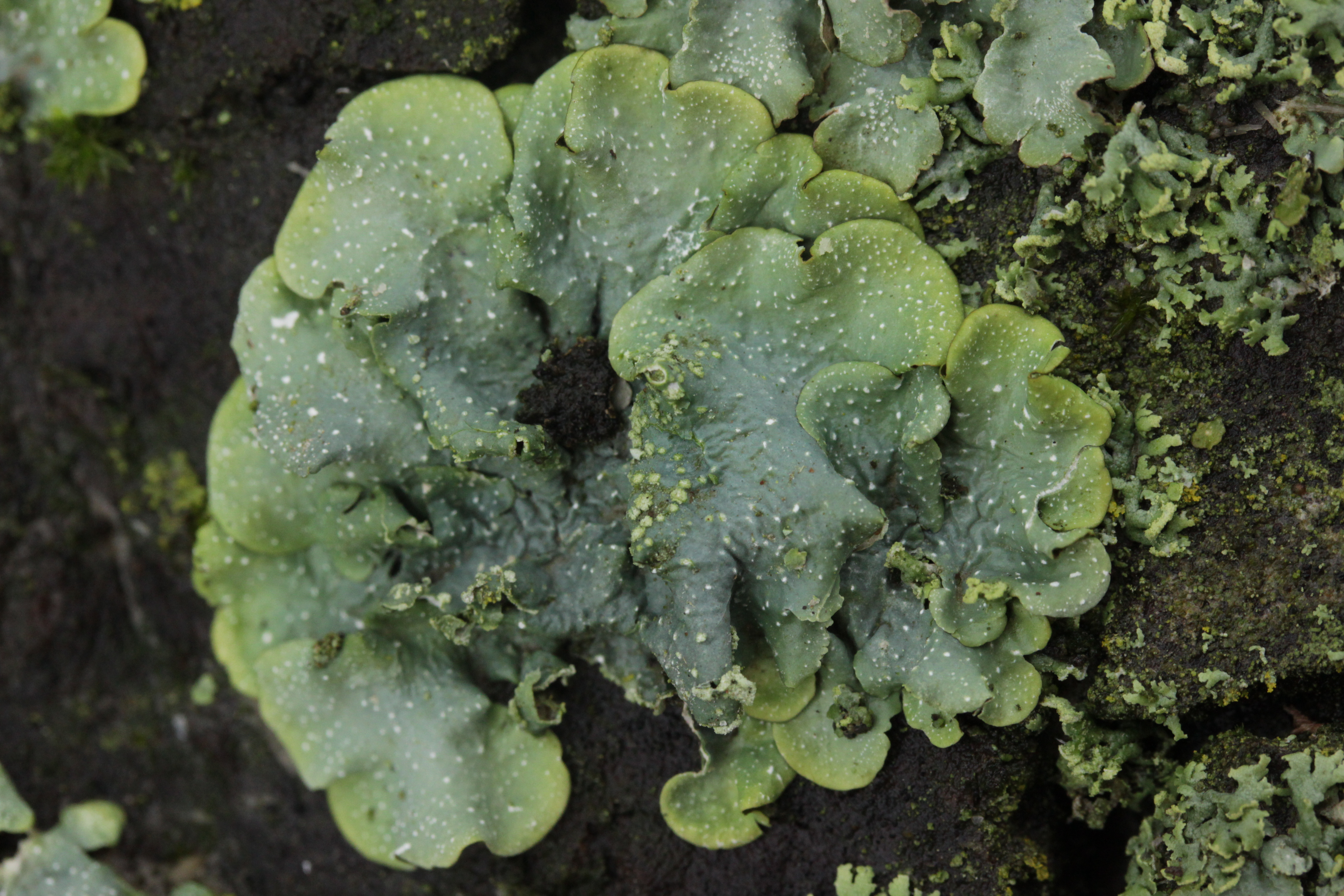
- Punctelia borreri

Scientific classification
- Kingdom: Fungi
- Division: Ascomycota
- Class: Lecanoromycetes
- Order: Lecanorales
- Family: Parmeliaceae
- Genus: Punctelia; Krog (1982)

Type species
- Punctelia borreri (Sm.) Krog (1982)

Species
- See text

= Punctelia =

Genus of foliose lichens

Punctelia is a genus of foliose lichens belonging to the large family Parmeliaceae. The genus, which contains about 50 species, was segregated from genus Parmelia in 1982. Characteristics that define Punctelia include the presence of hook-like to thread-like conidia (asexual spores), simple rhizines (root-like structures that attach the lichen thallus to its substrate), and point-like pseudocyphellae (tiny pores on the thallus surface that facilitate gas exchange). It is this last feature that is alluded to in the vernacular names speckled shield lichens or speckleback lichens.

Punctelia lichens grow on bark, wood, and rocks. The genus has a worldwide distribution, occurring on all continents but Antarctica. Species are found in temperate to subtropical locations. Punctelia has centres of distribution in the Neotropics and Africa; about half of the known species occur in South America. The photobiont partners of Punctelia are green algae in the genus Trebouxia. Some pollution-sensitive Punctelia species have been proposed for use as bioindicators of air pollution.

== Systematics ==
Norwegian lichenologist Hildur Krog circumscribed Punctelia in 1982. Originally, the genus contained 22 species segregated from Parmelia based on differences in the development of the pseudocyphellae, secondary chemistry, and phytogeography. The earliest-published member of this group, Parmelia borreri, was assigned as the type species of the genus. This widely distributed lichen was first described by James Edward Smith in 1807, followed by Dawson Turner in 1808.

Before Krog's publication, species with point-like pseudocyphellae, known as the Parmelia borreri group, fell under Parmelia subgenus Parmelia, section Parmelia, subsection Simplices. Krog divided Punctelia into two subgenera: Punctelia subgenus Punctelia, with hook-shaped (unciform) conidia and atranorin as a major cortical substance, and Punctelia subgenus Flavopunctelia, with bifusiform conidia and usnic acid as a major cortical substance. Mason Hale later identified Flavopunctelia as a separate genus with four species, based on conidial shape and chemical traits. A 2005 molecular phylogenetic analysis confirmed their genetic independence from Parmelia, and established genus boundaries.

In North America, these lichens are commonly known as "speckled shield lichens" or "speckleback lichens". The genus name, derived from the Latin punctum ("small spot" or "dot") refers to the pseudocyphellae.

=== Phylogenetics ===
- - - - - - - A
              - P. guanchica
              - P. rudecta
            - P. toxodes
          - B
            - - - P. missouriensis
                - P. aff rudecta
              - P. ruderata
            - - P. perreticulata
              - P. subrudecta
        - C
          - - P. jeckeri
            - P. caseana
          - P. pseudocoralloidea
      - D
        - P. bolliana
        - P. appalachensis
    - P. hypoleucites
  - E
    - - - - P. borreri
          - P. subpraesignis
        - P. reddenda
    - P. stictica

Phylogeny of Punctelia, using sequences from about a third of its species. Letter labels on the lines correspond to the five monophyletic clades recognized in Punctelia.

Punctelia is a member of the large lichen family Parmeliaceae. In 2017, Pradeep Divakar and colleagues applied a "temporal phylogenetic" approach to define taxonomic ranks within Parmeliaceae, inferring that groups of species diverging 29.45–32.55 million years ago signify distinct genera. They suggested synonymizing the lichenicolous genus Nesolechia with Punctelia (its lichen-forming sister group), because Nesolechia's relatively recent origin falls within their timeframe threshold for genus classification. This synonymy was not accepted in a review of Parmeliaceae classification soon afterwards. Although the authors (Arne Thell, Ingvar Kärnefelt, and Mark Seaward) recognized Nesolechia's place in Parmeliaceae and its morphological reduction in Punctelia, they suggest that "since the parasitic genera appear as sister groups ... synonymization feels hardly necessary". Robert Lücking, critiquing the temporal phylogenetic method, also dismissed the proposed synonymy, stating that merging genera based solely on divergence time does not align with taxonomy's need to mirror evolutionary history.

Molecular phylogenetics analysis has refined Punctelia species identification, uncovering many cryptic species – a growing research trend in Parmeliaceae research. For Punctelia, P. rudecta was once considered to be globally distributed across the Americas, Africa, and Asia. Phylogenetic analysis revealed a species complex that has subsequently been split into four distinct cryptic lineages with more restricted distributional ranges, reducing P. rudecta's range to North America. This study also uncovered five Punctelia clades, each with unique medullary chemistry: clades A, B, and C have species with lecanoric acid, clade D has species with gyrophoric acid as the main compound, while clade E has two species with fatty acids as the main secondary chemical.

== Description ==
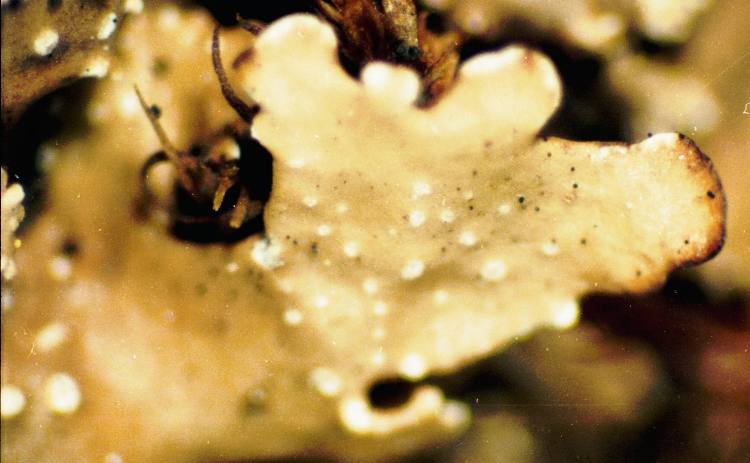
Herbarium specimen of Punctelia rudecta showing rounded pseudocyphellae on a lobe.

Punctelia lichens are medium-sized, foliose (leafy), and grey to greyish-green, although collected specimens gradually lose their colour tone. The size range for most typical specimens is 4 to 20 cm (1 1/2 to 7 3/4 in) in diameter. The lobes that comprise the thallus are typically 3–10 mm (1/8–3/8 in) across. The medulla is white, while the lower surface ranges from pale to black. Simple, unbranched rhizines are present that extend to the edge of the lobe; they are usually more or less the same colour as the thallus underside, although individuals with light rhizines on a dark background are not unusual.

A major characteristic of Punctelia is the presence of point-like (punctate) pseudocyphellae on the surface of the thallus. These are tiny pores that facilitate gas exchange. In the genus Parmelia, pseudocyphellae are straight and without a distinct form, and typically situated on the thallus surface (laminal) and/or on the margins (marginal). In comparison, Punctelia pseudocyphellae are rounded (orbicular) and laminal, although in some species the cortex gets pushed around the edges of the thallus, giving them a marginal appearance. Electron microscopy of Parmelia pseudocyphellae reveals a perforated polysaccharide layer; this layer is absent in Punctelia. Pseudocyphellae are termed conspicuous when they can be viewed with the naked eye, inconspicuous when a hand lens or microscope is needed to see them, and subtle for intermediate states where they can be seen only with concerted effort.

The apothecia (sexual reproductive structures) are lecanorine, with brown discs. Ascospores are colourless, ellipsoid, and number eight per ascus; they range in size from 10–27 to 6–18 μm. The unciform (hook-like) shape of the conidia is another major characteristic of genus Punctelia. These are short rods measuring 4–7 μm long with one end curved. Although not all Punctelia species have unciform conidia, this conidial shape only occurs in Punctelia. Some species have filiform (threadlike) conidia that are in the size range 7–12 μm long by 0.8–1 μm wide. The size and shape of the conidia is an important character in some species; for example, P. graminicola and P. hypoleucites are morphologically indistinguishable from each other, and they can only be reliably identified by differences in their conidia. Cell walls of Punctelia lichens contain the alpha glucan polysaccharide isolichenan.

Other Parmeliaceae genera that are superficially similar to Punctelia and have pseudocyphellae are Flavopunctelia and Cetrelia. Flavopunctelia species tend to be yellower than Punctelia due to the presence of usnic acid in the cortex. Cetrelia is usually larger with lobes measuring 1–2 cm (3/8–13/16 in), a dark lower thallus surface, and few rhizines.

Secondary chemicals found in the genus include atranorin in the cortex, and gyrophoric acid in the medulla. Lecanoric acid has been detected as a minor component in Punctelia jujensis and P. subrudecta.

=== Photobiont ===
Most lichen genera associate with a photobiont partner from one algal genus. Punctelia is no exception to this general rule; it associates with species from the most common photobiont genus, Trebouxia. In a study of photobiont partner selectivity, Punctelia subrudecta specimens collected from central Europe were shown to have a moderate selectivity, associating with three species of Trebouxia: T. jamesii, T. arboricola, and T. gelatinosa (the latter most frequently). The photobiont partner for P. rudecta is Trebouxia anticipata.

An investigation centred on the lichen species Punctelia borreri and P. subrudecta, which are prominent in Europe's temperate and Mediterranean forest ecosystems, confirmed that these fungi predominantly collaborate with Trebouxia gelatinosa. This symbiotic relationship appears to be influenced by the diverse climates of the Iberian Peninsula. While each Punctelia species has unique associations with specific microalgal lineages, some photobiont lineages are common to both. These shared lineages seem to be region-specific, hinting at a potential influence of local climate on these fungal-algal interactions.

== Habitat and distribution ==
Punctelia lichens are generally found on bark, wood, and rocks. However, P. constantimontium and P. subpraesignis have been recorded utilising cement mortar as a growing surface in Verónica, Buenos Aires. In the biodiverse cerrado forests of Brazil, they are more or less limited to well-lit microhabitats without direct sunlight. They have a temperate to subtropical distribution with centers of distribution in the Neotropics and Africa. Rarely does the geographical range of Punctelia species extend to boreal and cold mountainous areas; an exception is Punctelia stictica, which has been recorded in Greenland. Collectively, the genus has a cosmopolitan distribution, occurring on all continents, with the exception of Antarctica. Only a few species are known to occur in Asia and Australia; in contrast, most Parmelia species occur in these regions. Five species are known from Australia, including two cosmopolitan species and three endemic Australasian species. Sixteen Punctelia species occur in the continental United States and Canada. About half of the known Punctelia species are found in Brazil. Revised accounts of the genus have been published for several European countries in recent decades, including Norway (2000), Switzerland (2003), Denmark (2007), Lithuania (2010), and Poland. Seven species occur in Europe.

== Conservation ==
As of October 2023, only a single species of Punctelia has been assessed for the global IUCN Red List. Because it has an abundant and widespread population in North America with no sign of decline, Punctelia caseana is considered a species of least concern.

== Species ==
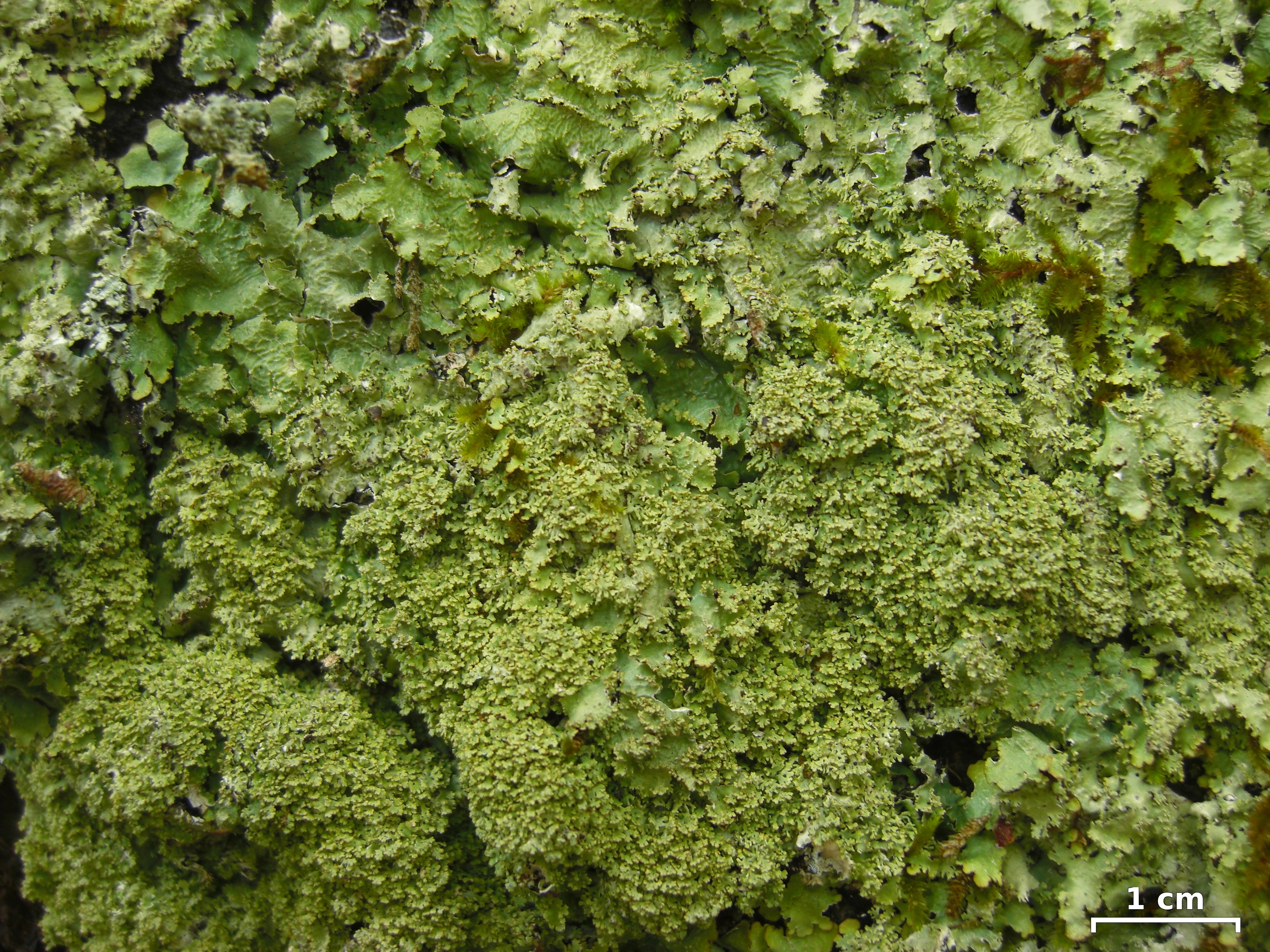
Punctelia appalachensis

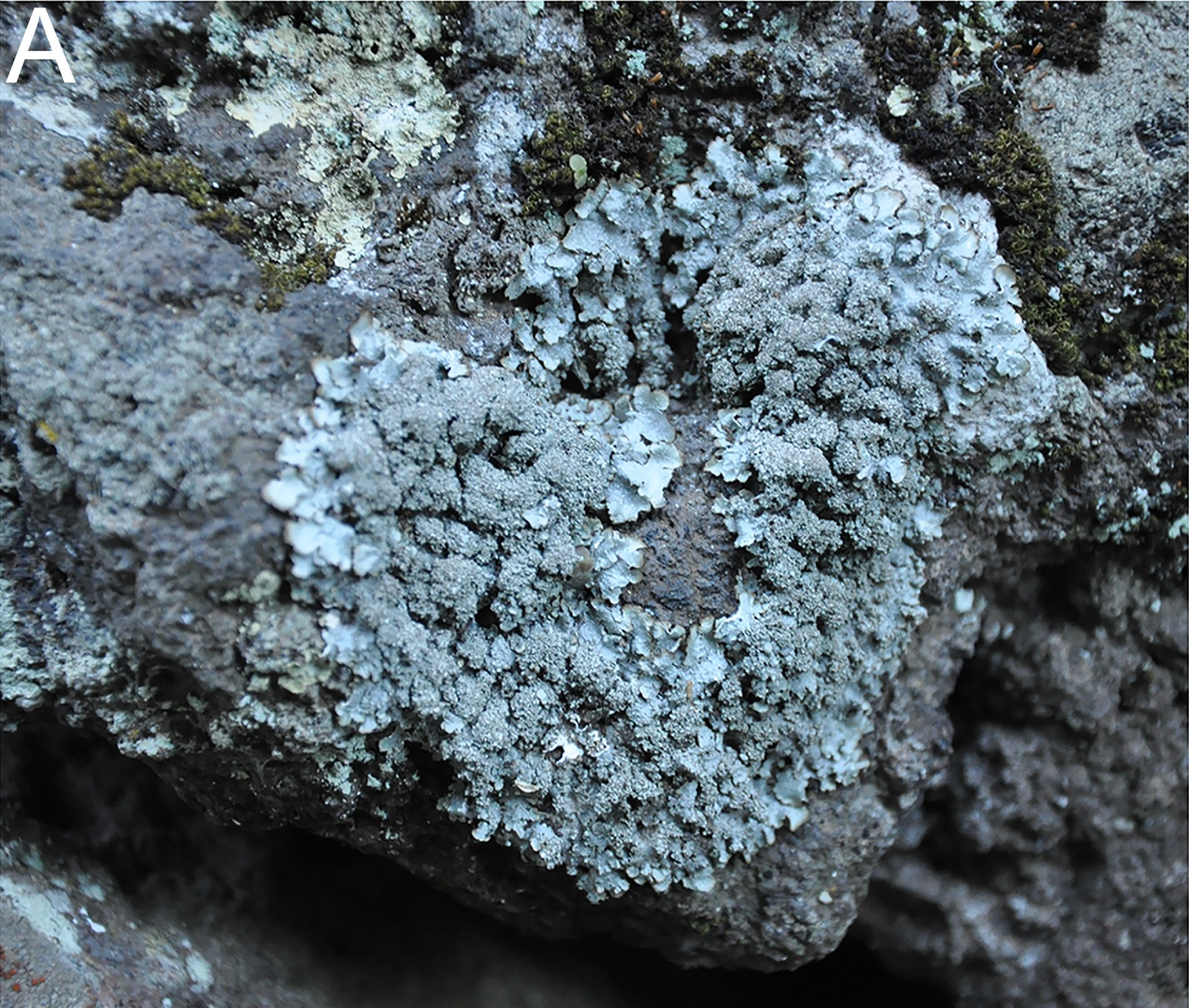
Punctelia guanchica

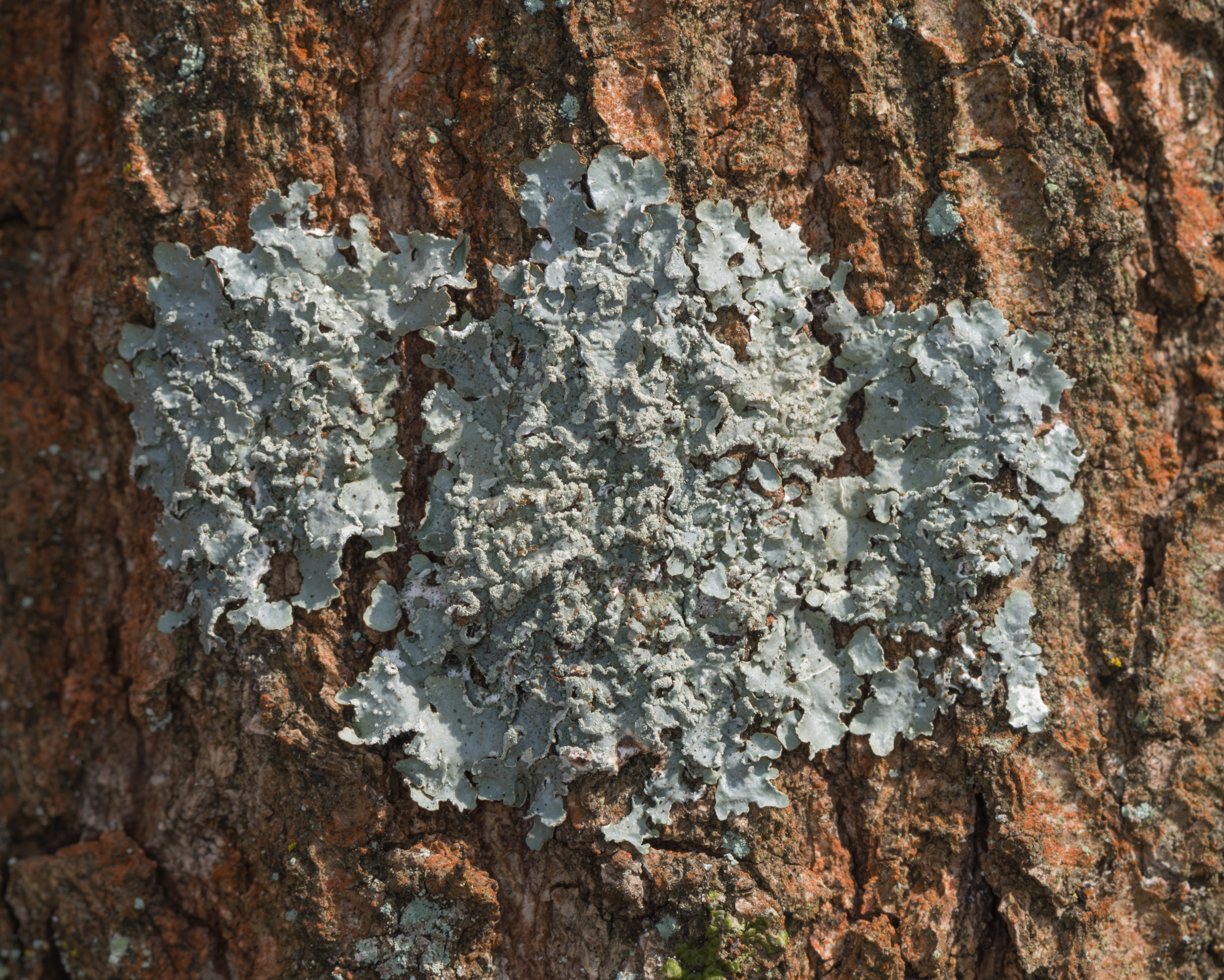
Punctelia jeckeri

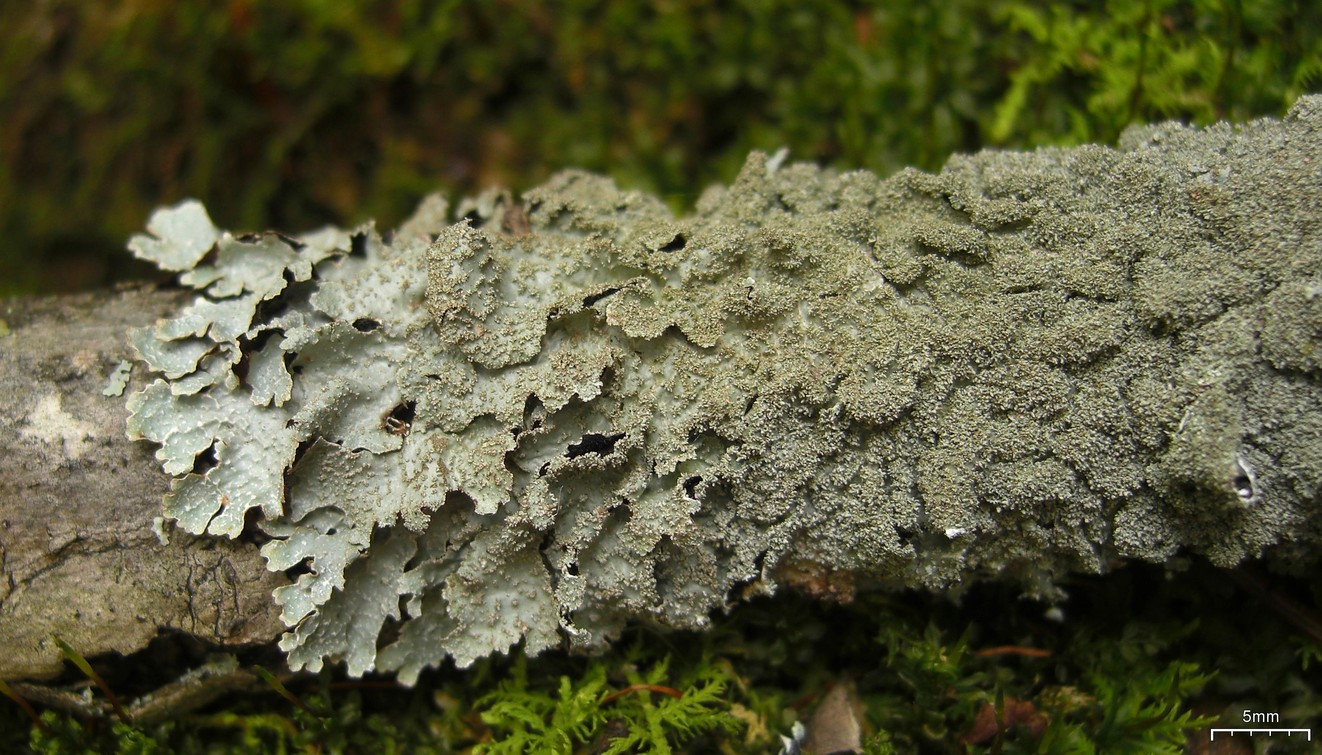
Punctelia rudecta

A recent (2022) estimate places 48 species in the genus Punctelia. As of October 2023, Species Fungorum accepts 30 species of Punctelia.

- Punctelia appalachensis (W.L.Culb.) Krog (1982) – United States
- Punctelia bolliana (Müll.Arg.) Krog (1982) – North America
- Punctelia borreri (Turner) Krog (1982) – cosmopolitan
- Punctelia borrerina (Nyl.) Krog (1982) – South America; Mexico
- Punctelia canaliculata (Lynge) Krog (1982) – South America
- Punctelia caseana Lendemer & B.P.Hodk. (2010) – eastern United States
- Punctelia cedrosensis Egan & Elix (2004) – Baja California; northern Mexico
- Punctelia colombiana Sérus. (1984) – South America
- Punctelia constantimontium Sérus. (1983) – Africa; South America; Mexico
- Punctelia crispa Marcelli, Jungbluth & Elix (2009) – Brazil
- Punctelia diffractaica Kurok. (1999) – Peru
- Punctelia digitata Jungbluth, Marcelli & Elix (2009) – Brazil
- Punctelia eganii B.P.Hodk. & Lendemer (2011) – Alabama
- Punctelia fimbriata Marcelli & Canêz (2007) – Brazil
- Punctelia graminicola (B.de Lesd.) Egan (2003) – North America
- Punctelia guanchica Alors, A.Crespo & Divakar (2016) – Canary Islands
- Punctelia hypoleucites (Nyl.) Krog (1982) – Africa; North America; South America
- Punctelia imbricata Marcelli, Jungbluth & Elix (2009) – Brazil
- Punctelia involuta Canêz & Marcelli (2010) – Brazil
- Punctelia jeckeri (Roum.) Kalb (2007) – Europe; Mexico
- Punctelia jujensis Adler (1998) – South America
- Punctelia microsticta (Müll.Arg.) Krog (1982) – South America
- Punctelia missouriensis G.Wilh. & Ladd (1992) – United States
- Punctelia nashii Marcelli & Canêz (2011) – California
- Punctelia nebulata Elix & J.Johnst. (1988) – Australia
- Punctelia negata (Nyl.) Krog (1982) – South America
- Punctelia neutralis (Hale) Krog (1982) – Africa; Asia
- Punctelia novozelandica Elix & J.Johnst. (1988) – New Zealand
- Punctelia osorioi Canêz & Marcelli (2010) – Brazil
- Punctelia perreticulata (Räsänen) G.Wilh. & Ladd (1987) – Europe; North America; South America; Australia; New Zealand
- Punctelia pseudocoralloidea (Gyeln.) Elix & Kantvilas (2001) – Australia
- Punctelia punctilla (Hale) Krog (1982) – Africa; South America; North America
- Punctelia purpurascens Marcelli & Canêz (2007) – Brazil
- Punctelia reddenda (Stirt.) Krog (1982) – Africa; Europe; North America; South America
- Punctelia riograndensis (Lynge) Krog (1982) – Africa; South America
- Punctelia roseola Jungbluth, Marcelli & Elix (2009) – Brazil
- Punctelia rudecta (Ach.) Krog (1982) – North America
- Punctelia ruderata (Vain.) Canêz & Marcelli (2016) – Asia and East Africa
- Punctelia stictica (Delise ex Duby) Krog (1982) – Africa; Europe; North America; South America; Greenland
- Punctelia subalbicans (Stirt.) D.J.Galloway & Elix (1984) – Australia; New Zealand
- Punctelia subflava (Taylor) Elix & J.Johnst. (1988) – Australia
- Punctelia subpraesignis (Nyl.) Krog (1982) – South Africa; South America; Mexico
- Punctelia subrudecta (Nyl.) Krog (1982) – cosmopolitan
- Punctelia tomentosula Kurok. (1999) – Peru
- Punctelia toxodes (Stirt.) Kalb & M.Götz (2007) – South Africa
- Punctelia transtasmanica Elix & Kantvilas (2005) – Tasmania, New Zealand
- Punctelia ulophylla (Ach.) Herk & Aptroot (2000) – Europe

The species Punctelia pallescens, described by Syo Kurokawa in 1999 as a new species from western Australia, is considered synonymous with P. subalbicans. Parmelia helenae, described by Maurice Bouly de Lesdain in 1937 and transferred to Punctelia in 1998, was considered by some lichenologists to be a questionable taxon because, according to Teuvo Ahti, "the type material is insufficient to resolve its taxonomic relationship with Punctelia perrituculata ... and P. subrudecta ... on the basis of conidial characters". It is now placed in synonymy with P. subrudecta. Punctelia semansiana (W.L.Culb. & C.F.Culb.) Krog is the same species as Punctelia graminicola.

== Parasites ==
Many species of lichenicolous fungi have been recorded using Punctelia as a host. These include: Abrothallus parmeliarum, Didymocyrtis melanelixiae, Epithamnolia xanthoriae, Lichenoconium usneae, Llimoniella bergeriana, Lichenohendersonia uniseptata, Nesolechia oxyspora, Pronectria oligospora, Pyrenidium sp., Rinodina conradii, Sphaerellothecium reticulatum, Tremella parmeliarum, Trichosphaerella buckii, and Xenonectriella subimperspicua. One of these fungal parasites—Xenophoma puncteliae—is named after its host's genus.

== Human uses ==
=== Biomonitoring ===
Some members of Punctelia have been shown to be somewhat sensitive to air pollution. One research study identified apparent signs of damage on thalli in areas potentially affected by air pollution. The researchers suggested that the distinctive colour changes seen on Punctelia thalli could result from pollutants affecting the thylakoid membranes of the trebouxioid algae. This disturbance might cause the release of K+ ions, which then interact with lichen compounds, leading to these coloured markings. A study conducted in Spain observed Punctelia borreri and P. subrudecta reappearing in areas with a decline in SO_{2} pollution. Two Punctelia species have been recommended for use as element bioindicators in air pollution monitoring studies in the eastern United States. Punctelia rudecta is suggested for use in cooler forested uplands, and P. missouriensis for use in isolated woodlands or urban areas. Because of the widespread occurrence of P. hypoleucites in both urban and industrial sites in and around Tandil, Argentina, it has been proposed as a potential biomonitor of air pollution in that city.

=== Traditional medicine ===
Punctelia borreri has been used in traditional Chinese medicine as an alleged remedy for a variety of ailments, including chronic dermatitis, blurred vision, bleeding from the uterus or from external injuries, and for sores and swelling. To use, a decoction was drunk, or the dried and powdered lichen applied directly to the affected area.

=== Dyeing ===
Punctelia rudecta can be used to create a dye by a color-extraction with ammonia as a solvent. A pink color is obtained using this method.
