= Punctelia colombiana =

Scientific classification
- Domain: Eukaryota
- Kingdom: Fungi
- Division: Ascomycota
- Class: Lecanoromycetes
- Order: Lecanorales
- Family: Parmeliaceae
- Genus: Punctelia
- Species: P. colombiana

Binomial name
- Punctelia colombiana Sérus. (1984)

Species of lichen

Punctelia colombiana is a species of corticolous (bark-dwelling) and foliose (leafy) lichen in the family Parmeliaceae. It is found in South America.

== Taxonomy ==
The lichen was formally described as a new species in 1984 by Belgian lichenologist Emmanuël Sérusiaux, from collections made in the Andean Mountains of Colombia. The type specimen was collected near Medellín, at an altitude of 1,800 m (5,900 ft). The specific epithet colombiana refers to the country where it was first scientifically documented. The species was later recorded in Argentina and Brazil (Rio Grande do Sul).

== Description ==
The thallus of Punctelia colombiana attains a diameter of up to 18 cm (7.1 in). It is tightly attached to its bark substrate, and has a greenish-gray to ash-grey colour. Pseudocyphellae are white, small (measuring 0.1–0.2 mm in diameter) and evenly distributed throughout the thallus surface. Isidia are present over much of the surface. The medulla is white, and it measures 80.0–130.0 μm thick. The thallus undersurface is mostly black with a dark brown zone around the margin. Rhizines are dark brown to black, with a branching pattern ranging from unbranched to irregular; they are abundant and evenly distributed around the margin.

The upper cortex is paraplenctenchymatous; this refers to a type of tissue in which the hyphae are oriented in all directions, and is analogous to the parenchyma of plants. The upper cortex is covered by a thin epicortex, although it is ruptured on the areas above the pseudocyphellae. The pseudocyphellae are formed from the rupture and disintegration of the upper cortex cells, which exposes the hyphae of the medulla. The size of the pore gradually increases as the cells around the inside perimeter disintegrate and the medullary hyphae grow into the pore area. Air pockets, called aeroplectenchyma, occur under the upper cortex in the region in contact with the algal layer. These pockets are thought to help with the internal diffusion of gases produced during photosynthesis of the algal component of the lichen.

The conidia (asexual spores) are threadlike (filiform), measuring 9–12 by 1 μm. Ascospores are ellipsoid, number eight per ascus, and measure 14–16 by 10–13 μm. Major secondary chemicals present in the lichen are atranorin and gyrophoric acid.

== Similar species ==
A 1996 study compared the morphological and chemical differences between Punctelia colombiana and Punctelia stictica, concluding that the species are closely related but distinct, and are possibly derived from Punctelia jujensis. A lookalike species is Punctelia constantimontium, also found in South America. It is distinguished from P. colombiana by its hook-like (unciform) conidia, and its persistently flat lobulae that never develop into isidia.
