= Punctelia nebulata =

Scientific classification
- Kingdom: Fungi
- Division: Ascomycota
- Class: Lecanoromycetes
- Order: Lecanorales
- Family: Parmeliaceae
- Genus: Punctelia
- Species: P. nebulata

Binomial name
- Punctelia nebulata Elix & J.Johnst. (1988)

Species of lichen

Punctelia nebulata is a species of foliose lichen in the family Parmeliaceae. Found in Australia, it was formally described as a new species in 1988 by lichenologists John A. Elix and Jen Johnston. The type was collected in New South Wales, on a roadside north of Gilgandra. The lichen grows on Callitris trees in semi-arid, inland regions of southern Australia.

It has a foliose thallus closely attached to its substrate. The upper surface of the thallus is pale grey to mineral grey, sometimes blackening with age. The thallus is up to 8 cm (3.1 in) in diameter, made of somewhat irregularly shaped, crowded lobes measuring 2–4 cm (0.8–1.6 in) wide. The lower surface of the thallus is pale.

The major secondary compounds in Punctelia nebulata are atranorin and chloroatranorin. Punctelia nebulata had been previously misidentified with Punctelia subalbicans, from which it can be only reliably identified using chemical methods: P. subalbicans contains lecanoric acid in the medulla, whereas the thallus of P. nebulata does not have any lichen acids.
