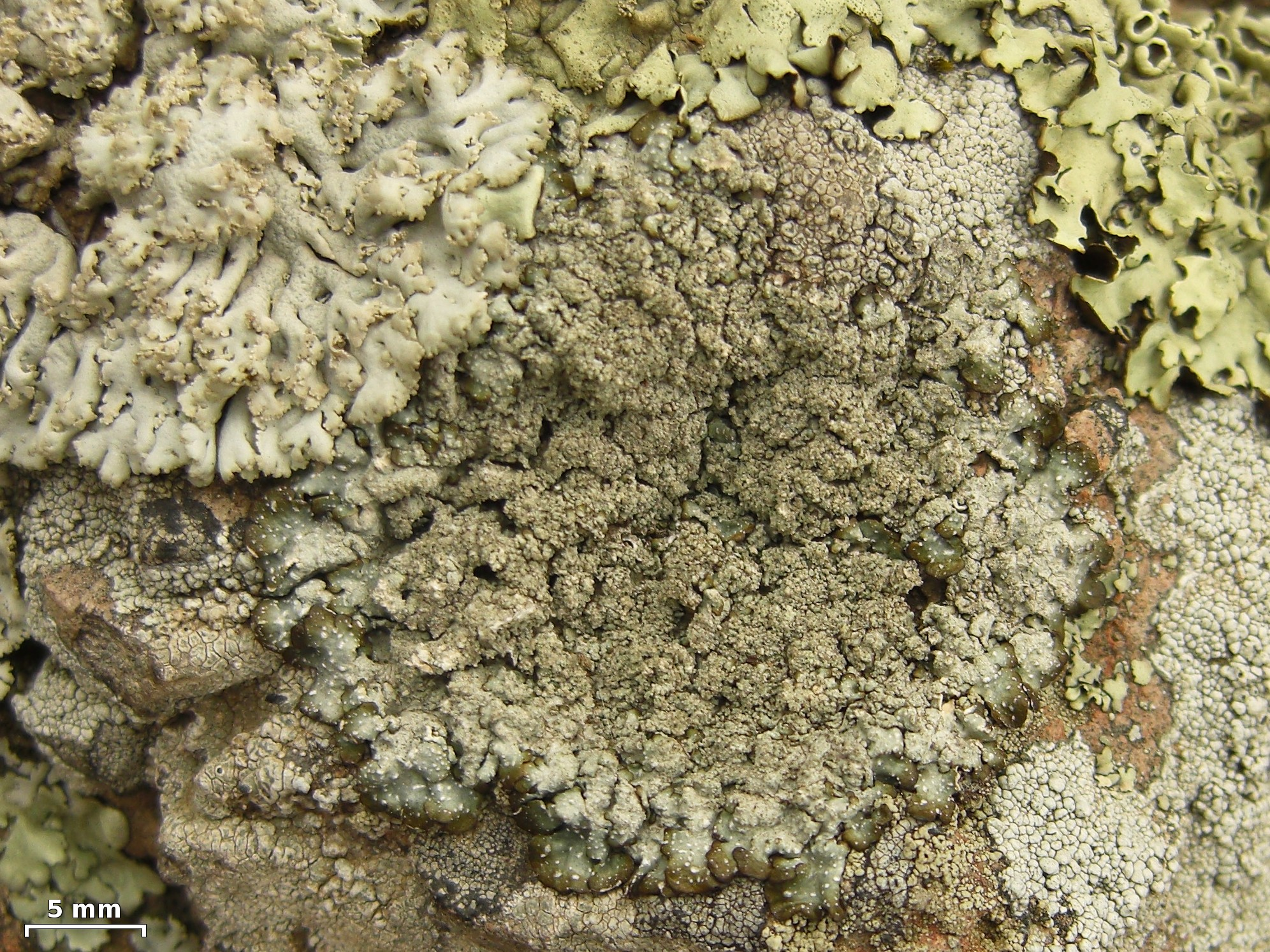
- On Conejo Mountain, southern California

Scientific classification
- Domain: Eukaryota
- Kingdom: Fungi
- Division: Ascomycota
- Class: Lecanoromycetes
- Order: Lecanorales
- Family: Parmeliaceae
- Genus: Punctelia
- Species: P. punctilla

Binomial name
- Punctelia punctilla (Hale) Krog (1982)

Synonyms
- Parmelia punctilla Hale (1977)

= Punctelia punctilla =

Species of lichen

Punctelia punctilla is a species of foliose lichen in the family Parmeliaceae. It is found in Africa, South America, and North America, where it grows on bark and on rocks. The main characteristics that distinguish Punctelia punctilla from other species of Punctelia are the presence of isidia on the thallus surface, a pale brown thallus undersurface, and the presence of lecanoric acid in the medulla.

== Taxonomy ==
It was first formally described in 1977 as a new species by American lichenologist Mason Hale as Parmelia punctilla. The type specimen was collected by Ove Almborn in the Cathedral Peak area of South Africa, where it was found growing on a rock in Indumeni forest. The altitude of the type locality was 5,500 m (18,000 ft). Hildur Krog transferred it to the genus Punctelia in 1982.

In 1997, Mónica Adler proposed to synonymize the taxon Punctelia missouriensis with P. punctilla. André Aptroot later rejected this proposal, suggesting sufficient morphological differences exist for P. missouriensis to warrant distinction as an independent species.

== Description ==
Punctelia punctilla has a light mineral grey foliose thallus with darker margins. It is tightly attached to its substrate. There are abundant pseudocyphellae on that thallus surface; they are white, rounded to elongated, and measure up to 0.5 mm. The isidia are dull and low, sometimes branched, and often originate in cracks or at the margins of the pseudocyphellae. The thallus undersurface is pale tan with darker margins. Rhizines are usually simple (i.e. unbranched) and more or less the same colour as the undersurface.

Standard chemical spot tests can be used to help identify Punctelia punctilla. In the medulla, these results are K-, KC+ red, and C+ red. The last of these tests indicates the presence of lecanoric acid. The upper cortex contains atranorin, which results in a yellow K+ reaction.

Species similar in appearance to Punctelia punctilla include Punctelia rudecta and Punctelia eganii, two North American endemics that are morphologically indistinguishable from each other.

== Habitat and distribution ==
Punctelia punctilla has been recorded growing on both bark and on rocks. First described from South Africa, it was later recorded from various locations in South America, including several provinces of Argentina (Mendoza, Buenos Aires, Santiago, Corrientes, Córdoba, and Río Negro), Brazil (São Paulo), and Venezuela. The lichen was first reported from the United States in 1989; the material was verified by Mason Hale. It was found growing on rocks at the base of a rocky outcrop in southern coastal California, in Point Mugu State Park; this area has a Mediterranean climate. A herbarium specimen of Punctelia punctilla collected in Iowa was later assumed to be a misidentification. The lichen has also been recorded from the Mexican state Baja California Sur.
