= Punctelia canaliculata =

Scientific classification
- Kingdom: Fungi
- Division: Ascomycota
- Class: Lecanoromycetes
- Order: Lecanorales
- Family: Parmeliaceae
- Genus: Punctelia
- Species: P. canaliculata

Binomial name
- Punctelia canaliculata (Lynge) Krog (1982)

Synonyms
- Parmelia canaliculata Lynge (1914)

Species of lichen

Punctelia canaliculata is a species of foliose lichen in the family Parmeliaceae. It is found in South America.

== Taxonomy ==
The lichen was first formally described in 1914 by Norwegian botanist Bernt Arne Lynge as Parmelia canaliculata. Hildur Krog transferred it to the newly created subgenus Punctelia in 1982. She noted that the lichen differed from all other species of Punctelia in having marginal to submarginal apothecia, many with perforated discs (mainly marginal), pycnidia immersed in the thallus, and sublinear, canaliculate lobes (with longitudinal grooves) similar to those of some Platismatia species. Other characteristics suggested a placement in Punctelia, such as the form of the pseudocyphellae, the unciform (hook-like) pcynidia, and unknown fatty acids similar to those found in Punctelia reddenda.

== Distribution ==
Punctelia canaliculata is found in Brazil and Uruguay.
