= Punctelia diffractaica =

Scientific classification
- Kingdom: Fungi
- Division: Ascomycota
- Class: Lecanoromycetes
- Order: Lecanorales
- Family: Parmeliaceae
- Genus: Punctelia
- Species: P. diffractaica

Binomial name
- Punctelia diffractaica Kurok. (1999)

Species of lichen

Punctelia diffractaica is a species of foliose lichen in the family Parmeliaceae. It is found in Peru.

== Taxonomy ==
The lichen was described as a species new to science by Japanese lichenologist Syo Kurokawa in 1999. The type was collected by colleague Hiroyuki Kashiwadani in the Saylla District (Cuzco Province), where it was found in a pasture on the side of a road, growing on a calcareous rock at an altitude of about 3,200 m (10,500 ft). It is named for its uncommon metabolite, diffractaic acid.

== Description ==
The lichen has a foliose (leafy) thallus that is greenish-gray in colour, with a tight attachment to its substrate. It has a more or less rough, leathery texture, reaching dimensions of 8–10 cm (3.1–3.9 in) in diameter, comprising irregular lobes that are 2–4 cm (0.8–1.6 in) wide. Like all species of Punctelia, P. diffractaica has minute pores – pseudocyphellae – that help facilitate gas exchange. The thallus surface features isidia that originate either from the pseudocyphellae, or directly from the surface. The medulla is white, while the underside of the thallus is black, with sparse, short black rhizines less than 1 mm long. In the type specimen, most of the apothecia (sexual reproductive organs) were juvenile, measuring less than 2 mm in diameter, and not reported in the description.

Punctelia diffractaica contains atranorin and diffractaic acid is its main secondary chemicals. The latter chemical is rare in the family Parmeliaceae, and not otherwise known to occur in genus Punctelia. It is the presence of this chemical that allows this species to be distinguished from the morphologically similar species Punctelia punctilla, which also occurs in South America. Diffractaic acid is in the class of compounds called depsides, and has been scientifically investigated for biological properties such as antioxidant, antiulcerogenic and gastroprotective effects.
