= Punctelia fimbriata =

Scientific classification
- Domain: Eukaryota
- Kingdom: Fungi
- Division: Ascomycota
- Class: Lecanoromycetes
- Order: Lecanorales
- Family: Parmeliaceae
- Genus: Punctelia
- Species: P. fimbriata

Binomial name
- Punctelia fimbriata Marcelli & Canêz 2007

Species of lichen

Punctelia fimbriata is a species of foliose lichen in the family Parmeliaceae. Found in Brazil, it was formally described as a new species in 2007 by Luciana Canêz and Marcelo Marcelli. The type specimen was collected in the municipality of Vicara in the southern Brazilian state of Rio Grande do Sul. There it was found growing on a tree trunk in an open field on an abandoned farm. It has a greenish-gray thallus measuring up to 10 cm (4 in) in diameter. The specific epithet fimbriata refers to the characteristic phyllidia of this species. Phyllidia are small, corticate, scale-like, dorsiventral structures that develop at the margins or on the upper surface of a lichen thallus. In Punctelia fimbriata, these delicate structures at the margins of the thallus may become lobulate (lobe-like) in age, and develop a "fringed" (fimbriate) appearance.
