= Punctelia imbricata =

Scientific classification
- Domain: Eukaryota
- Kingdom: Fungi
- Division: Ascomycota
- Class: Lecanoromycetes
- Order: Lecanorales
- Family: Parmeliaceae
- Genus: Punctelia
- Species: P. imbricata

Binomial name
- Punctelia imbricata Marcelli, Jungbluth & Elix (2009)

Species of lichen

Punctelia imbricata is a species of foliose lichen in the family Parmeliaceae. Found in Brazil, it was described as a new species in 2009 by lichenologists Marcello Marcelli, Patrícia Jungbluth, and John Alan Elix. The holotype was collected in the Paulista municipality of São Paulo State. There it was found growing on the trunk of a mango tree, which was in a shaded and humid location in an orchard. The lichen has a greenish-grey thallus measuring 15–20 cm (6–8 in) wide, with a smooth upper surface that becomes a bit wrinkled in age; the lower surface is black. Punctelia imbricata contains trace amounts of atranorin and lecanoric acid, minor amounts of orcinyl lecanorate, and gyrophoric acid as the major secondary metabolite in the medulla. The specific epithet imbricata refers to the "imbricate" lobules (i.e. having overlapping edges).
