= Punctelia digitata =

Scientific classification
- Domain: Eukaryota
- Kingdom: Fungi
- Division: Ascomycota
- Class: Lecanoromycetes
- Order: Lecanorales
- Family: Parmeliaceae
- Genus: Punctelia
- Species: P. digitata

Binomial name
- Punctelia digitata Jungbluth, Marcelli & Elix (2009)

Species of lichen

Punctelia digitata is a species of foliose lichen in the family Parmeliaceae. Found in Brazil, it was described as a new species in 2009 by lichenologists Patrícia Jungbluth, Marcello Marcelli, and John Alan Elix. The holotype was collected from Itirapina municipality in São Paulo State. It was found growing on a tree trunk in a cerrado forest, at an altitude of 770 m (2,530 ft). The thallus is greyish in colour, measuring 4.5–10 cm (2–4 in), comprising irregularly branched lobes with a width of 2–4 mm (0.08–0.16 in). The specific epithet digitata (Latin for "finger-like") refers to the characteristic shape of the lacinules (vegetative propagules). The lichen contains trace amounts of atranorin, and lecanoric acid as the main secondary metabolite.
