= Punctelia cedrosensis =

Scientific classification
- Domain: Eukaryota
- Kingdom: Fungi
- Division: Ascomycota
- Class: Lecanoromycetes
- Order: Lecanorales
- Family: Parmeliaceae
- Genus: Punctelia
- Species: P. cedrosensis

Binomial name
- Punctelia cedrosensis Egan & Elix (2004)

Species of lichen

Punctelia cedrosensis is a species of foliose lichen in the family Parmeliaceae. It is endemic to Mexico, where it grows on the bark of conifers.

== Taxonomy ==
The lichen was formally described as a new species in 2004 by lichenologists Robert Egan and John Alan Elix. The type specimen was collected on Cedros Island (Baja California) at an altitude of 1,100 m (3,600 ft), where it was growing on Juniperus californicus. Its range was later extended to northern Mexico (Nuevo León and Tamaulipas).

== Description ==
Punctelia cedrosensis has a blue-grey foliose (leafy) thallus comprising individual flattened lobes that are 3–6 mm (0.12–0.24 in) wide. Pseudocyphellae are rare; dense isidia occur on the thallus surface. The thallus undersurface ranges in colour from pale tan to light to medium brown. Rhizines are abundant, evenly distributed, and range in colour from light brown to brownish-black. The conidia are unciform (hook-like), measuring 4–6 by 1 μm. The cortex contains atranorin and chloroatranorin, while the medulla contains protoconstipatic, constipatic, dehydroconstipatic, and dehydroprotoconstipatic acids.

It is somewhat similar in appearance to the more common North American species Punctelia rudecta, but P. cedrosensis has much fewer pseudocyphellae, and does not produce lecanoric acid in its medulla.
