= C16H14O7 =

The chemical formula C_{16}H_{14}O_{7} can refer to:

- Cedeodarin
- 1,3-Dihydroxy-2,4,7-trimethoxyxanthone
- 1,6-Dihydroxy-3,4,7-trimethoxyxanthone
- 1,8-Dihydroxy-3,4,7-trimethoxyxanthone
- Filifolin
- Lecanoric acid
- 8-Methoxyeriodictyol
- Mycochromone
- Padmatin
- Ulocladol
