= Punctelia involuta =

Scientific classification
- Domain: Eukaryota
- Kingdom: Fungi
- Division: Ascomycota
- Class: Lecanoromycetes
- Order: Lecanorales
- Family: Parmeliaceae
- Genus: Punctelia
- Species: P. involuta

Binomial name
- Punctelia involuta Canêz & Marcelli (2010)

Species of lichen

Punctelia involuta is a species of foliose lichen in the family Parmeliaceae. Found in Brazil, it was described as a new species in 2010 by Luciana Canêz and Marcelli Marcelo. It is a member of the Punctelia microsticta species group, a set of related Punctelia lichens with a black lower surface and similar morphology. The type specimen of Punctelia involuta was collected in São Luiz do Paraitinga at the Serra do Mar State Park. In an open forest there it was found growing on mosses at the base of a thin, rotting Myrtaceae trunk; the elevation was 975 m (3,200 ft).

The thallus of Punctelia involuta is whitish, measuring 22 by 11 cm (8.7 by 4.3 in). The lobes making up the thallus are irregularly branched with rounded tips, crowded closely together, and measure 2.5–6.5 mm (0.1–0.3 in) wide. They are involute (with the margins curled inwards somewhat), a feature for which the species is named. The medulla is white, while the lower surface of the thallus is black. Soralia and isidia are absent from the thallus surface. The conidia made by the lichen have a short threadlike (filiform) shape, and measure 7–9 μm.

In terms of reactivity to standard lichen spot tests, the upper cortex of Punctelia involuta is K+ (yellow, indicating the presence of atranorin), UV−; the medulla is K−, C–, KC−, P−, and UV−. The C− result of the medulla is one of the defining characteristics of this species that helps to distinguish it from other members in the Punctelia microsticta group.
