= Punctelia nashii =

Scientific classification
- Domain: Eukaryota
- Kingdom: Fungi
- Division: Ascomycota
- Class: Lecanoromycetes
- Order: Lecanorales
- Family: Parmeliaceae
- Genus: Punctelia
- Species: P. nashii

Binomial name
- Punctelia nashii Marcelli & Canêz (2011)

Species of lichen

Punctelia nashii is a species of foliose lichen in the family Parmeliaceae. It is known only from California.

== Taxonomy ==
The lichen was described as a new species in 2011 by the Brazilian lichenologists Marcelo Marcelli and Luciana da Silva Canêz. The type specimen was collected from the Hastings Natural History Reservation in Monterey County, a biological field station of the University of California. Here it was found growing on blue oak (Quercus douglasii) at an elevation of 560 m (1,840 ft). The specific epithet nashii honors Thomas Hawkes Nash III, "in recognition of his support and for collecting the holotype".

== Description ==
The lichen has a greenish-colored thallus about 10 by 14 cm (3.9 by 5.5 in), comprising irregularly branched lobes measuring 2.5 by 4.0 cm (1.0 by 1.6 in) wide. Soralia on the thallus surface are whitish, with granula soredia. This species does not produce isidia. The pseudocyphellae (one of the uniting features of the genus Punctelia) are few, and described as "inconspicuous". The undersurface of the thallus ranges from white to yellowish-brown. There are rhizines, both twisted short ones, and longer, sparser ones; both are brown, and always darker than the undersurface. Apothecia are absent.

The main secondary compounds in Punctelia nashii are atranorin and lecanoric acid. The lichen spot tests that give positive reactions in the upper cortex are K+ (yellow), and in the medulla C+ (rose), and KC+ (rose).
