= Punctelia roseola =

Scientific classification
- Domain: Eukaryota
- Kingdom: Fungi
- Division: Ascomycota
- Class: Lecanoromycetes
- Order: Lecanorales
- Family: Parmeliaceae
- Genus: Punctelia
- Species: P. roseola

Binomial name
- Punctelia roseola Jungbluth, Marcelli & Elix (2009)

Species of lichen

Punctelia roseola is a species of foliose lichen in the family Parmeliaceae. Found in Brazil, it was described as a new species in 2009 by lichenologists Patrícia Jungbluth, Marcello Marcelli, and John Alan Elix. The specific epithet refers to the pale rose colour of the medulla. The holotype was collected from Jurumirim municipality in São Paulo State, close to the Tietê River. There it was found growing on an isolated tree in a dry pasture, without direct sunlight. It has a grey thallus measuring 10–20 cm (4–8 in) wide; the lower thallus surface is pale, becoming darker (almost black) near the centre. The lichen contains atranorin, lecanoric acid, and several butlerins (A, B, E, and F) as minor compounds, butlerlin D as a somewhat major compound, and gyrophoric acid as the major secondary metabolite in the medulla.
