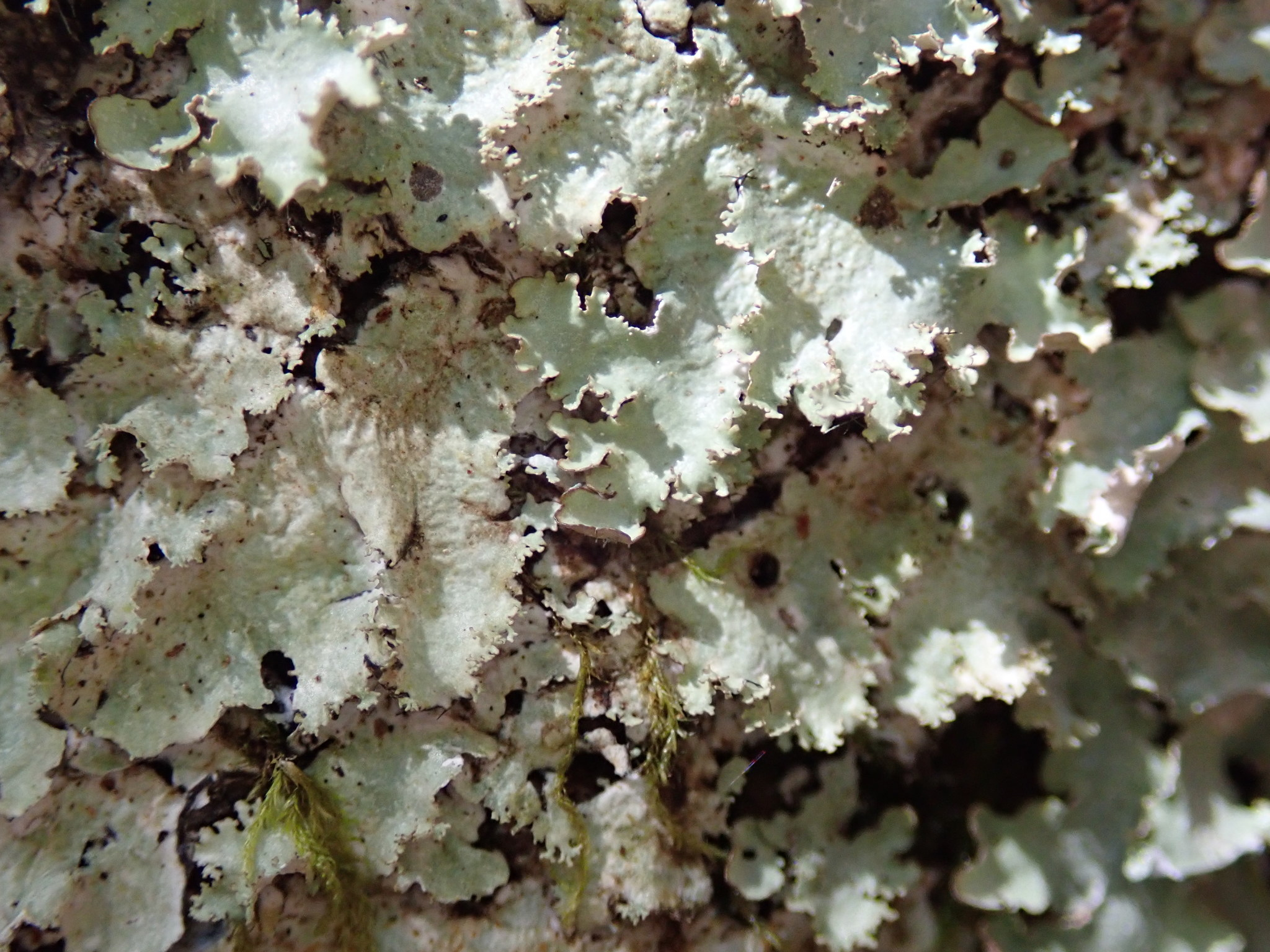
- In New Zealand

Scientific classification
- Kingdom: Fungi
- Division: Ascomycota
- Class: Lecanoromycetes
- Order: Lecanorales
- Family: Parmeliaceae
- Genus: Punctelia
- Species: P. subflava

Binomial name
- Punctelia subflava (Taylor) Elix & J.Johnst. (1988)

Synonyms
- Parmelia laceratula Nyl. (1860); Parmelia laceratula var. minor Shirley (1892); Parmelia subflava Taylor (1847); Parmelia subflava var. minor (Shirley) Zahlbr. (1929); Parmelia subrudecta var. australica Räsänen (1944)

= Punctelia subflava =

Species of lichen

Punctelia subflava is a species of foliose lichen in the family Parmeliaceae that occurs in Australia.

== Taxonomy ==
The lichen was first formally described in 1847 as Parmelia subflava by botanist Thomas Taylor. The type specimen, described from the herbarium collection of William Borrer, was collected on Tasmania (called Van Diemen's Land in the original publication). Taylor compared it to the common species Parmelia sulcata, noting that it was smaller, and had neither a reticulated surface nor the retuse lobes (having an obtuse or rounded apex with a shallow notch) characteristic of that widespread species. John Elix and Jen Johnston transferred Parmelia subflava to the genus Punctelia in 1988. Several years earlier, David Galloway and Elix had proposed Parmelia subflava to be synonymous with Punctelia rudecta. It is now known that Punctelia rudecta is a Northern Hemisphere species and does not occur in Australasia.

== Description ==
Identical in secondary chemicals, and similar in appearance to Punctelia rudecta, Punctelia subflava can be distinguished from that species by the form of the pseudocyphellae (sparse and point-like), the thickness of the thallus (thin and fragile), and the morphology of the isidia (always dorsiventral). The lecanoric acid derivative 5-chlorolecanoric acid occurs in this species.

Punctelia subflava is listed as "Extinct" on the schedules of the Tasmanian Threatened Species Protection Act 1995.
