= Punctelia subalbicans =

Scientific classification
- Domain: Eukaryota
- Kingdom: Fungi
- Division: Ascomycota
- Class: Lecanoromycetes
- Order: Lecanorales
- Family: Parmeliaceae
- Genus: Punctelia
- Species: P. subalbicans

Binomial name
- Punctelia subalbicans (Stirt.) D.J.Galloway & Elix (1984)

Synonyms
- Parmelia subalbicans Stirt. (1878); Parmelia hypoleuca Müll.Arg. (1887); Parmelia novae-hollandiae Zahlbr. (1932); Parmelia polycarpa Taylor (1847); Parmelia polycarpina Zahlbr. (1929); Parmelia victoriana Zahlbr. (1929); Parmelina subalbicans (Stirt.) D.J.Galloway (1983); Punctelia pallescens Kurok. (1999)

Species of lichen

Punctelia subalbicans is a species of foliose lichen in the family Parmeliaceae. It is found in Australia and New Zealand, where it grows on the bark of various tree species.

== Taxonomy ==
The lichen was first described as a new species by James Stirton in 1878. The holotype was collected by botanist James Drummond near Swan River in Western Australia. David Galloway suggested moving the taxon to the genus Parmelina in 1983, but a year later he and John Alan Elix transferred it to the genus Punctelia.

The taxon Punctelia pallescens, described by Syo Kurokawa in 1999 as a new species from western Australia, was later determined to be identical chemically and morphologically with P. subalbicans, and it is now considered a synonym.

== Description ==
The pale greenish-grey thallus of Punctelia subalbicans typically measures 5–10 cm (2–4 in) in diameter. Lobes comprising the thallus are irregularly shaped with rounded tips and are scalloped with dark margins; they are usually 2–5 mm (0.08–0.20 in) wide. Pseudocyphellae occurs along the margins of the lobes, and on the exciples (the ring-shaped layers surrounding the hymenium that develop into distinct margins) of the apothecia. The thallus undersurface is pale buff or cream, with a sparse to moderate number of rhizines, which themselves are unbranched and more or less the same colour as the thallus undersurface. The thallus surface lacks vegetative propagules such as isidia or soralia. Apothecia are common, especially near the centre of the thallus, and are up to 6 mm (0.24 in) across with a concave to flattened central disc that is brownish-red to dark brown in colour. Ascospores are 9–14 by 8–10 μm. The major secondary chemicals found in this species are lecanoric acid, atranorin, and chloroatranorin. The lecanoric acid derivative 5-chlorolecanoric has also been detected in this species.

== Distribution ==
In Australia, Punctelia subalbicans has been recorded from New South Wales, the Australian Capital Territory, Victoria, South Australia, and Western Australia. In the southern and eastern parts of the country, it commonly occurs on the bark of Callitris and Casuarina in regions where the amount of rainfall in low to moderate. The lichen is also encountered on old fenceposts. It is rarely collected in New Zealand, having been recorded only from Wellington and from Riccarton Bush in Christchurch, where it was found growing on Dacrycarpus dacrydioides.
