= Punctelia crispa =

Scientific classification
- Domain: Eukaryota
- Kingdom: Fungi
- Division: Ascomycota
- Class: Lecanoromycetes
- Order: Lecanorales
- Family: Parmeliaceae
- Genus: Punctelia
- Species: P. crispa

Binomial name
- Punctelia crispa Marcelli, Jungbluth & Elix (2009)

Species of lichen

Punctelia crispa is a species of foliose lichen in the family Parmeliaceae. Found in Brazil, it was described as a new species in 2009 by lichenologists Marcello Marcelli, Patrícia Jungbluth, and John Alan Elix. The holotype specimen was collected in the Botujuru quarter of Campo Limpo Paulista municipality in São Paulo State. There it was found in a transition zone between a mesophyllous forest and a cerrado forest, growing on a tree trunk. It has a greyish thallus loosely attached to its substrate, measuring up to 10 cm (4 in) in diameter. Soredia on the thallus surface have a coarse texture, and are dense so that it gives areas near the thallus centre a "crispate" appearance (i.e., curled or ruffled), a feature for which the species is named. The medulla is white, while the lower surface of the thallus is pale brown, becoming darker near the centre. The lichen contains atranorin as a minor substance, gyrophoric acid as a major substance, and trace amounts of lecanoric acid.
