= Punctelia neutralis =

Scientific classification
- Domain: Eukaryota
- Kingdom: Fungi
- Division: Ascomycota
- Class: Lecanoromycetes
- Order: Lecanorales
- Family: Parmeliaceae
- Genus: Punctelia
- Species: P. neutralis

Binomial name
- Punctelia neutralis (Hale) Krog (1982)

Synonyms
- Parmelia neutralis Hale (1971)

Species of lichen

Punctelia neutralis is a species of foliose lichen in the family Parmeliaceae. It was first formally described in 1971 by American lichenologist Mason Hale, as Parmelia neutralis. The type specimen was collected by Dutch mycologist Rudolf Arnold Maas Geesteranus from the Diepwalle Forest Reserve in Cape Province, South Africa. Hildur Krog transferred it to the Punctelia in 1982, when she promoted that taxon to generic status. In addition to several countries in Africa (Uganda, Congo, South Africa), the lichen has also been reported from India (Northwestern Himalayas and Tamil Nadu) and from Taiwan.
