= Punctelia novozelandica =

Scientific classification
- Kingdom: Fungi
- Division: Ascomycota
- Class: Lecanoromycetes
- Order: Lecanorales
- Family: Parmeliaceae
- Genus: Punctelia
- Species: P. novozelandica

Binomial name
- Punctelia novozelandica Elix & J.Johnst. (1988)

Species of lichen

Punctelia novozelandica is a species of foliose lichen in the family Parmeliaceae. Found in New Zealand, it was formally described as a new species in 1988 by John Alan Elix and Jen Johnston. The type specimen was collected in Port Hills, Banks Peninsula (Canterbury), where it was found growing on moist rock ledges in a remnant forest. The lichen grows on both rocks and tree bark in cool temperate podocarp forests on both islands of New Zealand. It is quite similar in appearance to Punctelia subflava, but is distinguished from that species by the black thallus undersurface (it is ivory to pale tan in P. subflava).
