= Punctelia pseudocoralloidea =

Scientific classification
- Domain: Eukaryota
- Kingdom: Fungi
- Division: Ascomycota
- Class: Lecanoromycetes
- Order: Lecanorales
- Family: Parmeliaceae
- Genus: Punctelia
- Species: P. pseudocoralloidea

Binomial name
- Punctelia pseudocoralloidea (Gyeln.) Elix & Kantvilas (2001)

Synonyms
- Parmelia pseudocoralloidea Gyeln. (1931)

Species of lichen

Punctelia pseudocoralloidea is a species of foliose lichen in the family Parmeliaceae. It is found in Australia, where it grows on bark and on wood.

== Taxonomy ==
The lichen was first formally described as a new species by Hungarian lichenologist Vilmos Kőfaragó-Gyelnik in 1931. The type specimen was collected near the lower Murray River by Charles French in 1887, and sent to Gyelnik for identification. In 1983, David John Galloway and John Elix proposed synonymising Parmelia pseudocoralloidea with Parmelia subrudecta, but later research suggested that this taxon is heterogeneous. For this reason, the name P. pseudocoralloidea was retained for use with the Australian species, as the type was collected from the Australian mainland, in contrast to the type for P. subrudecta, which was collected from Saint Paul Island.

Seven decades after Gyelnik's original publication, John Elix and Gintaras Kantvilas proposed transferring the taxon to Punctelia – a genus characterized by the presence of point-like (punctate) pseudocyphellae. The lichen is a member of the species complex that includes Punctelia subrudecta and P. perriticulata.

== Distribution ==
Punctelia pseudocoralloidea grows on bark and on wood. On Kangaroo Island, it has been recorded growing in low coastal woodland dominated by Allocasuarina verticillata, and it often occurs along with Anisomeridium austroaustraliense and Flavoparmelia rutidota. Punctelia pseudocoralloidea has also been recorded in Little Swanport, Tasmania, and from New South Wales.
