= Héctor S. Osorio =

Uruguayan pediatrician, bacteriologist, and lichenologist

Héctor Saúl Osorio Rial
- Born: January 4, 1928; Montevideo
- Died: October 30, 2016 (aged 88)
- Scientific career
- Fields: Lichenology
- Author abbrev. (botany): Osorio

Héctor Saúl Osorio Rial (1928–2016) was a pediatrician, bacteriologist, and lichenologist from Uruguay.

Osorio as a youth was keenly interested in natural science. He became a pediatrician and professional bacteriologist, but continued to pursue his avocation of field studies of nature, first in entomology and then in lichenology. He published over 90 scientific articles on the lichens of Uruguay, Argentina, and southern Brazil. At the Museo Nacional de Historia Natural (National Museum of Natural History) in Montevideo, he was assistant director from 1971 to 1985, director from 1985 to 1997, and director emeritus and associate researcher from 1997 to 2016. At Montevideo's Universidad de la Republica, he was a director of the Faculty of Sciences and Humanities and a professor of botany from 1974 to 1985.

== Eponyms ==
- Jenmania osorioi Henssen
- Ochrolechia osorioana Verseghy
- Punctelia osorioi Canêz & Marcelli
- Ramalina osorioi Kashiw., T.H.Nash & K.H.Moon (2007)
