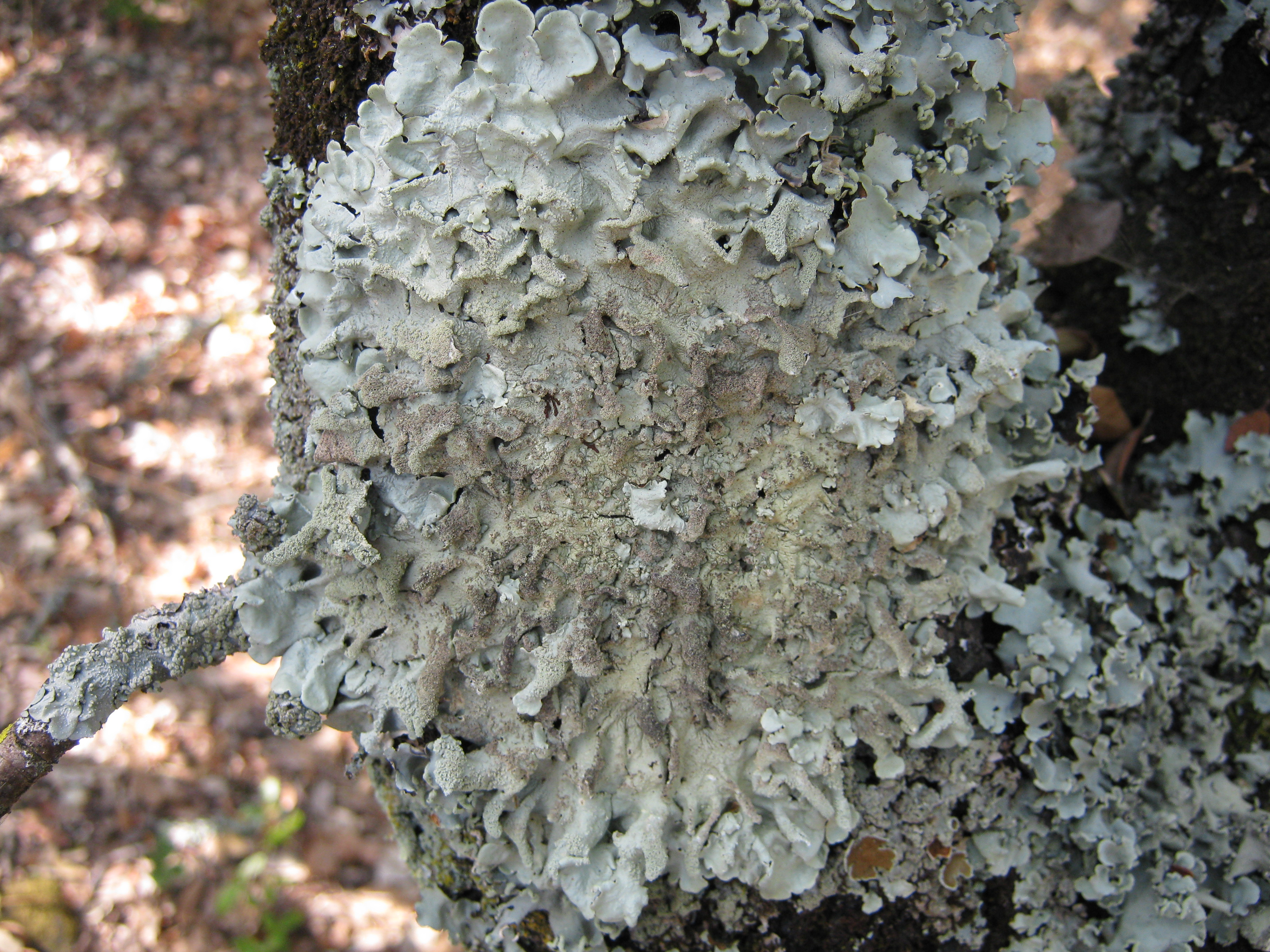
- in Monsanto Forest Park, Lisbon, Portugal

Conservation status
- Secure (NatureServe)

Scientific classification
- Kingdom: Fungi
- Division: Ascomycota
- Class: Lecanoromycetes
- Order: Lecanorales
- Family: Parmeliaceae
- Genus: Punctelia
- Species: P. reddenda

Binomial name
- Punctelia reddenda (Stirt.) Krog (1982)

Synonyms
- Parmelia reddenda Stirt. (1878); Parmelia borreri var. reddenda (Stirt.) Boistel (1903)

= Punctelia reddenda =

Species of lichen

Punctelia reddenda is a widely distributed species of foliose lichen in the family Parmeliaceae. It occurs in Africa, Europe, North America, and South America, where it grows on bark and on rock.

== Taxonomy ==
It was first described scientifically in 1903 by Scottish cryptogam specialist James Stirton, as Parmelia reddenda. The type was collected by botanist James McAndrew near New Galloway in Scotland. In 1982, Hildur Krog transferred the taxon to Punctelia, a newly circumscribed genus, with 22 pseudocyphella-possessing species segregated from Parmelia.

== Description ==
The lichen has an upper thallus surface that is grey, and covered with bright soredia. The lower surface of the thallus is black. The thallus diameter is typically 5.0–7.5 cm (2.0–3.0 in) broad, comprising irregularly branched and laterally overlapping lobes that are 1.0–5.5 millimetres (0.04–0.2 in) wide with rounded tips. Point-like, conspicuous (i.e., readily visible) pseudocyphellae are abundant on the surface. Also abundant are coarse, granular soredia. The medulla is white.

The cortex is K+ (yellow), indicating the presence of atranorin, while the medulla is negative for all lichen spot tests. A chemical analysis of Brazilian specimens using thin layer chromatography revealed the known compounds praesorediosic acid, protopraesorediosic acid, and protolichesterinic acid as well as an unidentified fatty acid.

The North American species Punctelia appalachensis is similar in appearance to P. reddenda, with a black thallus undersurface and negative medullary spot test reactions. However, it is distinguishable from P. reddenda because rather than soredia, it has abundant laminal and marginal lobulae (growths of the upper cortex or thallus margin, usually with a constricted base, that fall away as propagules).

== Habitat and distribution ==
Punctelia reddenda grows on bark, but has also been recorded growing on rock. An older (1974) source considered its European distribution to be more or less limited to coastal areas ranging from southern Sweden to Brittany. A 2008 survey of parmelioid lichens in Europe indicated its presence in Germany, Spain, France, Greece, Ireland, and Madeira, also noting that it was extinct in Sweden. In North America, its centre of distribution is the Appalachian Mountains. In the Great Smoky Mountains National Park, it is only found at elevations greater than 5,000 ft (1,500 m), in hardwood or spruce forests in the mountains. In South America, it occurs in Bolivia, Brazil, Chile, and Venezuela. It is also found in South Africa and Macaronesia.
