= Punctelia purpurascens =

Scientific classification
- Domain: Eukaryota
- Kingdom: Fungi
- Division: Ascomycota
- Class: Lecanoromycetes
- Order: Lecanorales
- Family: Parmeliaceae
- Genus: Punctelia
- Species: P. purpurascens

Binomial name
- Punctelia purpurascens Marcelli & Canêz (2007)

Species of lichen

Punctelia purpurascens is a species of foliose lichen in the family Parmeliaceae. Found in Brazil, it was formally described as a new species in 2007 by lichenologists Marcelo Marcelli and Luciana da Silva Canêz. The type specimen was collected in the municipality of Vicara in the southern Brazilian state of Rio Grande do Sul. There it was found growing on a basaltic rock in an open field. The specific epithet purpurascens refers to the unusual K+ purple reaction of the medulla.

== Description ==
Punctelia purpurascens has a green to grayish-green thallus measuring 10–15 cm (4–6 in) in diameter. The thallus is made of irregularly branched, crowded lobes measuring 1.5–6 mm (0.06–0.24 in) wide. The thallus also has lacinulae, which are long, slender, linear-elongated lobes; these generally have rounded tips and measure 0.5–4 by 0.3–2.0 mm (0.02–0.16 by 0.01–0.08 in). Vegetative propagules such as maculae, pustulae, soredia, and isidia are absent in this species. Pseudocyphellae are abundant, but they are inconspicuous due to their minute size (0.05–0.3 by 0.05–0.2 mm) and require effort to visualize. The medulla is white, sometimes with an orange tinge. The thallus undersurface is beige to dirty white, with a variable texture ranging from smooth to wrinkled, shiny or veiny. Rhizines are abundant and evenly dispersed; they are more or less the same colour as the thallus undersurface.

The pycnidia, visible as black dots, are typically greater in number around the thallus margins. They produce hook-like (unciform) conidia (asexual spores) that are 4.0–6.5 long by about 1 μm thick.

The standard lichen spot test results are K+ (yellow), C−, KC−, P−, and UV− in the cortex, indicating the presence of atranorin; in the medulla, which contains caperatic acid, the K+ (lilac or purple) reaction is distinctive.
