= Punctelia osorioi =

Scientific classification
- Domain: Eukaryota
- Kingdom: Fungi
- Division: Ascomycota
- Class: Lecanoromycetes
- Order: Lecanorales
- Family: Parmeliaceae
- Genus: Punctelia
- Species: P. osorioi

Binomial name
- Punctelia osorioi Canêz & Marcelli (2010)

Species of lichen

Punctelia osorioi is a species of foliose lichen in the family Parmeliaceae. It is found in Brazil.

== Taxonomy ==
The lichen was described as a new species in 2010 by Brazilian lichenologists Luciana da Silva Canêz and Marcello Marcelli. The type specimen was collected in Rio Grande do Sul state, in the municipality of Vacaria. Here it was found in an open field at an altitude of 860 m (2,820 ft), growing on the branch of a shrub, on the side of the Frade River. The specific epithet honours Uruguayan lichenologist Héctor Osorio, who, according to the authors, "contributed much to the development of our knowledge of lichenology in the Brazilian State of Rio Grande do Sul".

== Description ==
The lichen has a gray to greenish-gray thallus measuring up to 13 cm (5.1 in) in diameter. The undersurface of the thallus is pale brown to white, with a smooth to wrinkled texture. There are rhizines densely packed around the margins; they are the same colour as the undersurface or white. The long ones are up to 1.65 mm long, while the shorter ones up to 0.95 mm. Sometimes the rhizines project beyond the margins of the thallus. The medulla produces caperatic acid.

Punctelia osorioi is somewhat similar in morphology to Punctelia bolliana, but can be distinguished from that species by its denser rhizines on the margins of the thallus underside, and its smooth or scalloped lobe margins, which are never lacinate (irregularly and finely slashed) like in P. bolliana.

== Habitat and distribution ==
In addition to the type locality, Punctelia osorioi has also been recorded growing on trees in the trails of the Porto Alegre Botanical Garden in Porto Alegre.
