= Punctelia toxodes =

Scientific classification
- Kingdom: Fungi
- Division: Ascomycota
- Class: Lecanoromycetes
- Order: Lecanorales
- Family: Parmeliaceae
- Genus: Punctelia
- Species: P. toxodes

Binomial name
- Punctelia toxodes (Stirt.) Kalb & M.Götz (2007)

Synonyms
- Parmelia toxodes Stirt. (1878)

Species of lichen

Punctelia toxodes is a species of foliose lichen in the family Parmeliaceae. The lichen is a member of the Punctelia rudecta species complex. Found in South Africa, it was first formally described as a new species by English botanist James Stirton in 1878 as Parmelia toxodes. Klaus Kalb and Manuela Götz transferred it to the genus Punctelia in 2007. In his 1878 publication, Stirton did not designate a type specimen, so an epitype was designated in a 2016 publication. This epitype was collected from the Cape Floristic Region of South Africa, on Paarl Mountain at an altitude of 530 m (1,740 ft). The lichen grows on bark and on rocks.
