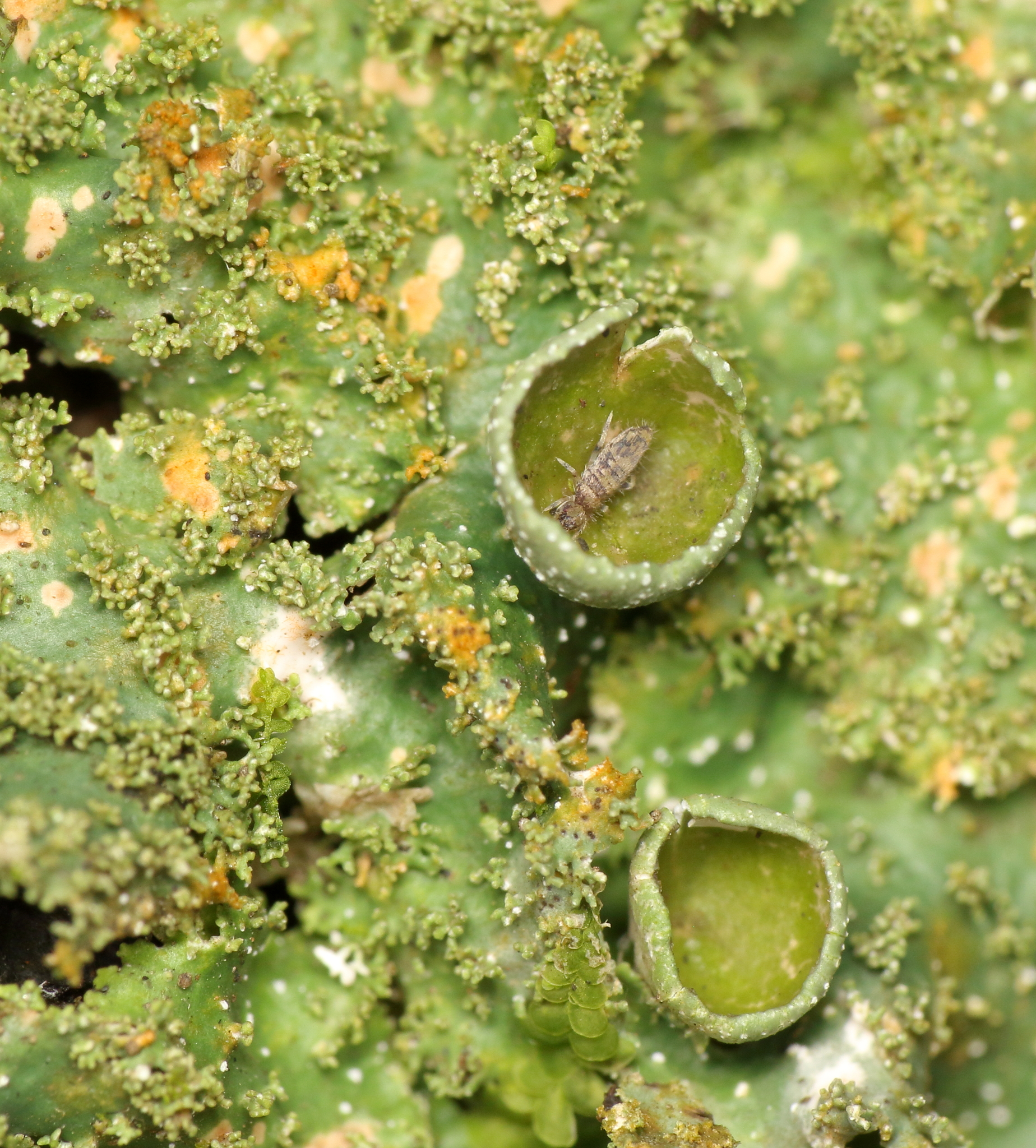

Scientific classification
- Domain: Eukaryota
- Kingdom: Fungi
- Division: Ascomycota
- Class: Lecanoromycetes
- Order: Lecanorales
- Family: Parmeliaceae
- Genus: Punctelia
- Species: P. constantimontium

Binomial name
- Punctelia constantimontium Sérus. (1983)

= Punctelia constantimontium =

Species of foliose lichen

Punctelia constantimontium is a species of foliose lichen in the family Parmeliaceae. Its range includes South America, Africa, and Mexico, where it grows on bark and twigs.

== Taxonomy ==
The lichen was described as a new species in 1983 by Belgian lichenologist Emmanuël Sérusiaux. The type locality is Little Connemara, Inyanga (in the Eastern Highlands of Zimbabwe) at an altitude of 2,300 m (7,500 ft). The type specimen was collected by botanist Constant Vanden Berghen. His last name is the Dutch translation of the phrase "of the mountains", and Sérusiaux used the Latinized form montium added to his first name to commemorate him in the naming of this species.

== Description ==
The lichen has a large leafy (foliose) blue-grey to ash-grey thallus comprising lobes that are 2–3 mm (0.08–0.12 in) wide. Circular, point-like pseudocyphellae are abundant on the thallus surface. The medulla is white, while the thallus undersurface is black, with abundant black rhizines. Apothecia are rare; if present, they are initially concave, but become flattened with age, and they have numerous pseudophyphellae on the apothecial margin. The ascospores are hyaline, ellipsoid, and measure 14–16 by 10–12 μm. Pycnidia are visible as brown to black dots immersed in the thallus surface; they produce hook-like (unciform) conidia that are 5–7 by 1 μm long.

The upper cortex is paraplenctenchymatous; this means that it is made of a type of tissue in which the hyphae are oriented in all directions, analogous to the parenchyma of plants. The upper cortex is covered by a thin epicortex, which is continuous even over the pseudocyphellae. The pseudocyphellae are formed from the inside to outside of the thallus. Hyphae in the medulla are organized in circular groups at specific sites of the thallus; these groups of hyphae push the algal cells towards the upper cortex—rupturing both cortex and epicortex—and exposing the medulla. The size of the pore gradually increases as the cortical cells around the inside perimeter disintegrate and the medullary hyphae grow into the pore area.

It contains the secondary compounds atranorin, chloroatroanorin, and gyrophoric acid. The standard lichen spot test results are K+ (yellow), C−, KC−, P−, and UV− in the upper cortex; in the medulla they are K−, KC+ (rose), C+ (rose), P−, and UV−.

== Habitat and distribution ==
In addition to Zimbabwe, Punctelia constantimontium has been recorded from South Africa, and in South America from Argentina, Brazil, and Uruguay. In Brazil, it has been found in the states Mato Grosso do Sul, Mato Grosso, Paraná, Rio Grande do Sul, and Santa Catarina. In 2016, its range was extended to include the Sierra Madre Oriental in northeastern Mexico. It generally grows on bark and twigs, although in one record it was reported growing on cement mortar in Verónica, Buenos Aires.
