= Punctelia riograndensis =

Scientific classification
- Kingdom: Fungi
- Division: Ascomycota
- Class: Lecanoromycetes
- Order: Lecanorales
- Family: Parmeliaceae
- Genus: Punctelia
- Species: P. riograndensis

Binomial name
- Punctelia riograndensis (Lynge) Krog (1982)

Synonyms
- Parmelia riograndensis Lynge (1914)

Species of lichen

Punctelia riograndensis is a species of foliose lichen in the family Parmeliaceae. Found in Africa and South America, it was formally described as a new species by Norwegian lichenologist Bernt Lynge in 1914, as Parmelia riograndensis. The type specimen was collected in 1892 from Porto Alegre Municipality in Rio Grande do Sul State (Brazil) by Swedish lichenologist Gustav Malme. In 1982, Hildur Krog circumscribed the genus Punctelia to contain Parmelia species with rounded pseudocyphellae, and P. riograndensis was one of the 22 species that she transferred to the new genus.

The lichen has a greenish-gray thallus measuring 6–8.5 cm (2.4–3.3 in) wide, and which is closely attached (adnate) to its substrate (tree bark). The lobes that comprise the thallus are crowded, sometimes overlapping, and measure 1.5–6 mm (0.06–0.24 in) wide. Pseudocyphellae on the thallus surface are abundant. The medulla is white. The lower thallus surface is either white, or variegated with black and white. It does not have maculae, pustulae, soredia, nor isidia. Ascospores have an ellipsoid to ovoid shape with one or two slightly spiky tips, and measure 20.0–26.5 by 12.5–16.0 μm. The conidia have an unciform (hooklike) shape and are 4–7 by about 1 μm.

The range of Punctelia riograndensis includes Africa and South America. In South America it has been recorded from Argentina, Brazil, and Uruguay.
