= Punctelia ruderata =

Scientific classification
- Kingdom: Fungi
- Division: Ascomycota
- Class: Lecanoromycetes
- Order: Lecanorales
- Family: Parmeliaceae
- Genus: Punctelia
- Species: P. ruderata

Binomial name
- Punctelia ruderata (Vain.) Canêz & Marcelli ex. Alors et al. (2016)

Synonyms
- Parmelia ruderata Vain. (1921)

Species of lichen

Punctelia ruderata is a species of foliose lichen in the family Parmeliaceae. It is a member of the Punctelia rudecta species complex. Found in Asia and East Africa, it was first formally described as a new species in 1921 by Finnish lichenologist Edvard August Vainio as Parmelia ruderata. The type was collected by Atsushi Yasuda in Honshu, Japan, where it was found growing on tree bark. The lichen was reported from South America in a 2009 Ph.D. thesis, and the taxon transferred to the genus Punctelia. The new combination, however, was not validly published, and molecular phylogenetic analysis showed that the species does not occur in Brazil. The name was resurrected and validly published in 2016.
