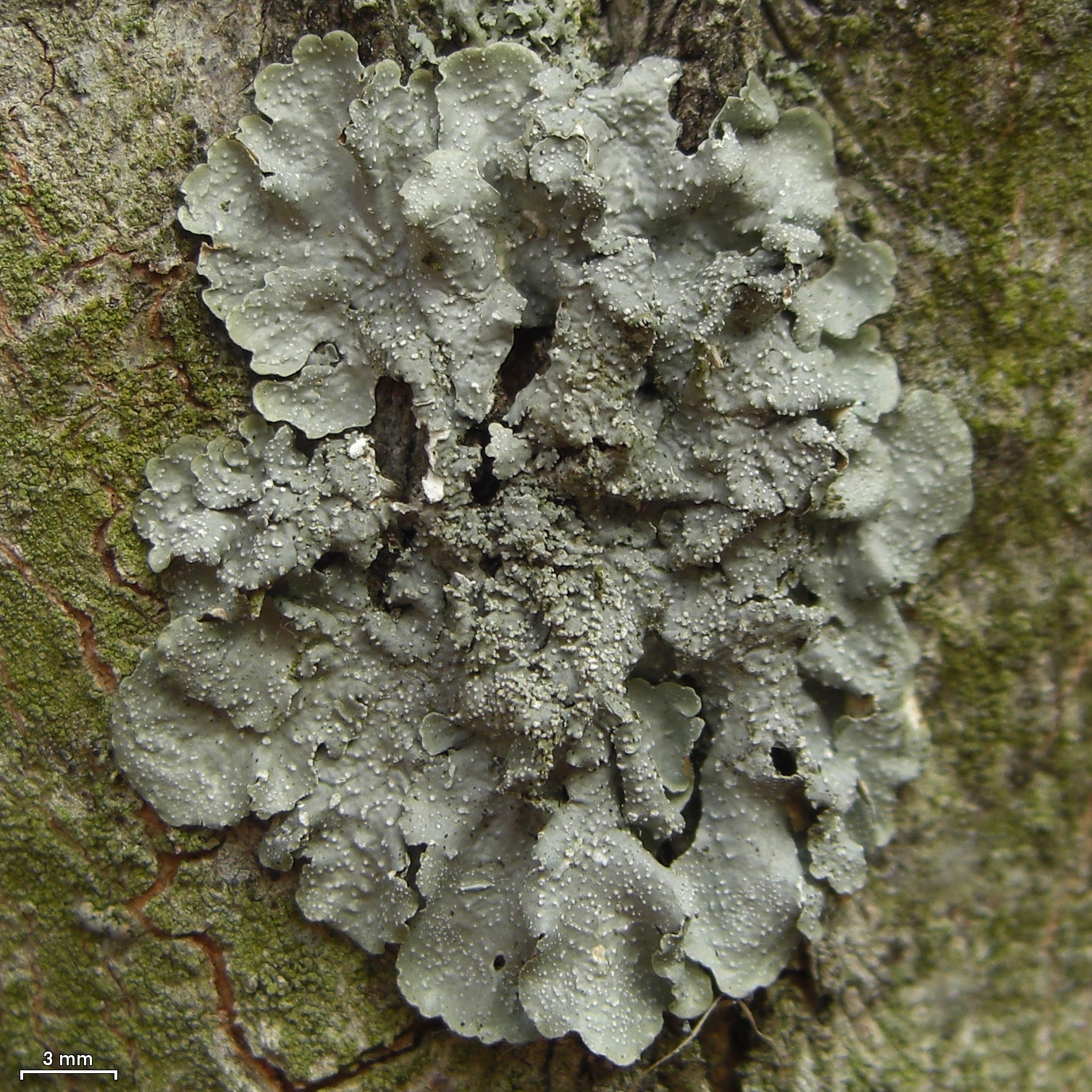
- in Eldersburg, Maryland

Scientific classification
- Kingdom: Fungi
- Division: Ascomycota
- Class: Lecanoromycetes
- Order: Lecanorales
- Family: Parmeliaceae
- Genus: Punctelia
- Species: P. missouriensis

Binomial name
- Punctelia missouriensis G.Wilh. & Ladd (1992)

= Punctelia missouriensis =

Species of lichen

Punctelia missouriensis, commonly known as the mealy speckled shield lichen, is a species of foliose lichen in the family Parmeliaceae. It is found in the southeastern United States, where it grows on tree bark and on rocks.

== Taxonomy ==
It was formally described as a new species in 1992 by Gerould Wilhelm and Douglas Ladd. The type specimen was collected by the authors in Crawford County, Missouri, in Onondaga Cave State Park. The specimen was found growing on a Juniperus virginiana in the Vilander Bluff Natural Area. Mónica Adler interpreted the soredia of this species as tiny isidia, and proposed to synonymise the taxon with the South American species Punctelia punctata, but other authorities considered it to have sufficient morphological differences to warrant distinction as an independent species. It is colloquially known as the mealy speckled shield lichen.

== Habitat and distribution ==
Punctelia missouriensis is found in the southeastern United States. It occurs in the tallgrass prairie biome in the U.S. Interior Highlands. Here it occurs regularly on the trunks of oak trees in open prairie and open savanna. It also occurs on siliceous rock faces with partial shade. Although it was reported to occur in South America, the specimens that were analyzed were actually of Punctelia punctata.
