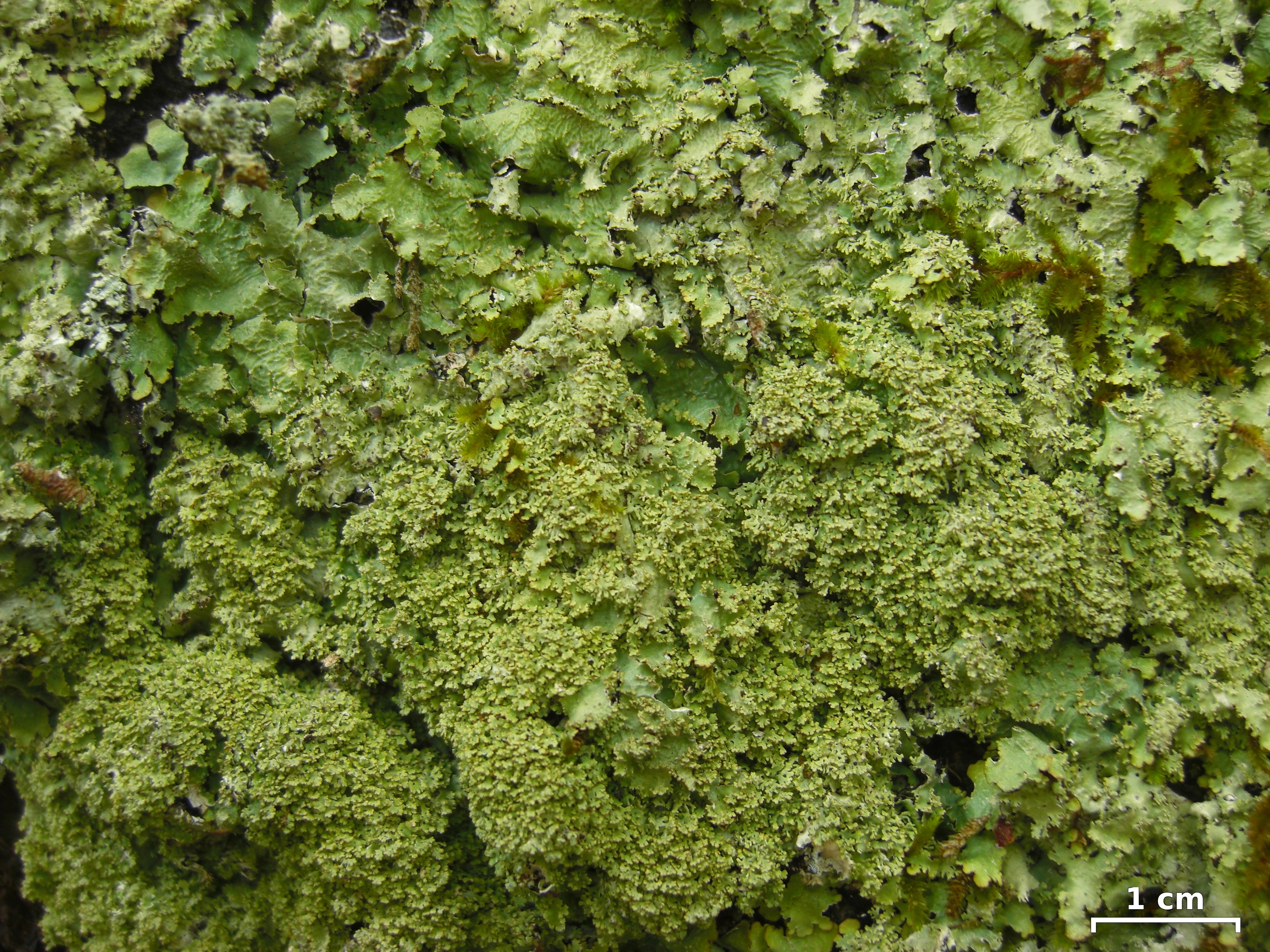
- A wet specimen found in Pisgah National Forest, North Carolina

Scientific classification
- Kingdom: Fungi
- Division: Ascomycota
- Class: Lecanoromycetes
- Order: Lecanorales
- Family: Parmeliaceae
- Genus: Punctelia
- Species: P. appalachensis

Binomial name
- Punctelia appalachensis (W.L.Culb.) Krog (1982)

Synonyms
- Parmelia appalachensis W.L.Culb. (1962)

= Punctelia appalachensis =

Species of lichen

Punctelia appalachensis, commonly known as the Appalachian speckled shield lichen, is a species of foliose lichen in the family Parmeliaceae. It is found in the eastern United States and eastern Canada. The lichen was first formally described in 1962 by lichenologist William Culberson as a species of Parmelia. He collected the type specimen growing on tree bark in West Virginia, Hildur Krog transferred it to the newly circumscribed genus Punctelia in 1982.

The thallus of Punctelia appalachensis is shiny and greenish-gray (drier individuals are bluish-grey); the surface is covered with maculae (spots or blotches) and pseudocyphellae. The underside of the thallus is black, at least in the center, with pale brown edges. Its dark underside allows it to be readily distinguished from other morphologically similar species in its range, such as Punctelia rudecta or P. caseana. The lichen usually grows on the bark of trees, but is sometimes found growing on rock.
