= Punctelia subpraesignis =

Conservation status
- Vulnerable (NatureServe)

Scientific classification
- Kingdom: Fungi
- Division: Ascomycota
- Class: Lecanoromycetes
- Order: Lecanorales
- Family: Parmeliaceae
- Genus: Punctelia
- Species: P. subpraesignis

Binomial name
- Punctelia subpraesignis (Nyl.) Krog (1982)

Synonyms
- Parmelia subpraesignis Nyl. (1896)

Species of lichen

Punctelia subpraesignis is a species of foliose lichen in the family Parmeliaceae. It occurs in Texas and Mexico, South America, and East Africa, where it grows on bark and on rocks. Major characteristics of the lichen that distinguish it from other Punctelia species include the C+ and KC+ rose spot tests of the medulla (indicating the presence of gyrophoric acid), ascospores that are smaller than 20 μm, and unciform (hooklike) conidia.

== Taxonomy ==
It was first described as a new species by Finnish lichenologist William Nylander in 1896, from specimens collected in Argentina. In 1982, Hildur Krog transferred it to Punctelia, a genus she circumscribed to contain Parmelia species with pseudocyphellae.

== Description ==
The greenish-gray thallus of Punctelia subpraesignis is 4.5–14 cm (1.8–5.5 in) in diameter. It comprises irregularly branched, overlapping lobes that are 1–5.5 mm (0.04–0.22 in) wide. The texture of the thallus surface ranges from smooth to wrinkled. Vegetative propagules such as lacinulae, maculae, pustulae, soredia, and isidia are absent in this species. Pseudocyphellae are abundant; they are point-like (punctate), typically rounded or ellipsoid, and occur throughout the thallus surface, margins, on protrusions, and on the amphithecia (the thalline margins of an apothecium). The medulla is white, sometimes with a rose tinge. The thallus undersurface is smooth and black with a pale brown to dark brown margin. Rhizines are brown to black, unbranched or irregularly branched. The urn-shaped (urceolate) to concave apothecia measure 0.3–12 mm (0.01–0.47 in) in diameter and have a brown disc without perforations. Ascospores are roughly spherical to ellipsoid, with dimensions of 11.0–15.0 by 7.5–12.0 μm. Conidia (asexual spores) are hook-like (unciform) and measure 4–7 by about 1 μm.

The standard lichen spot test results are K+ (yellow), and UV− in the cortex, indicating the presence of atranorin; in the medulla they are K−, KC+ (rose or red), C+ (rose or red), P−, and UV−, indicating the presence of gyrophoric acid.

== Habitat and distribution ==
Punctelia subpraesignis has been recorded from South Africa, South America (Argentina, Bolivia, Brazil, Uruguay), and Mexico. Its North American distribution extends north into Texas. It generally grows both on bark and rocks; in one record it was reported growing on cement mortar in Verónica, Buenos Aires.
