= Dorsiventral =

A dorsiventral (Lat. dorsum, "the back", venter, "the belly") organ is one that has two surfaces differing from each other in appearance and structure, as an ordinary leaf. This term has also been used as a synonym for dorsoventral organs, those that extend from a dorsal to a ventral surface. This word is also used to define body structure of an organism, e.g. flatworm have dorsiventrally flattened bodies.
