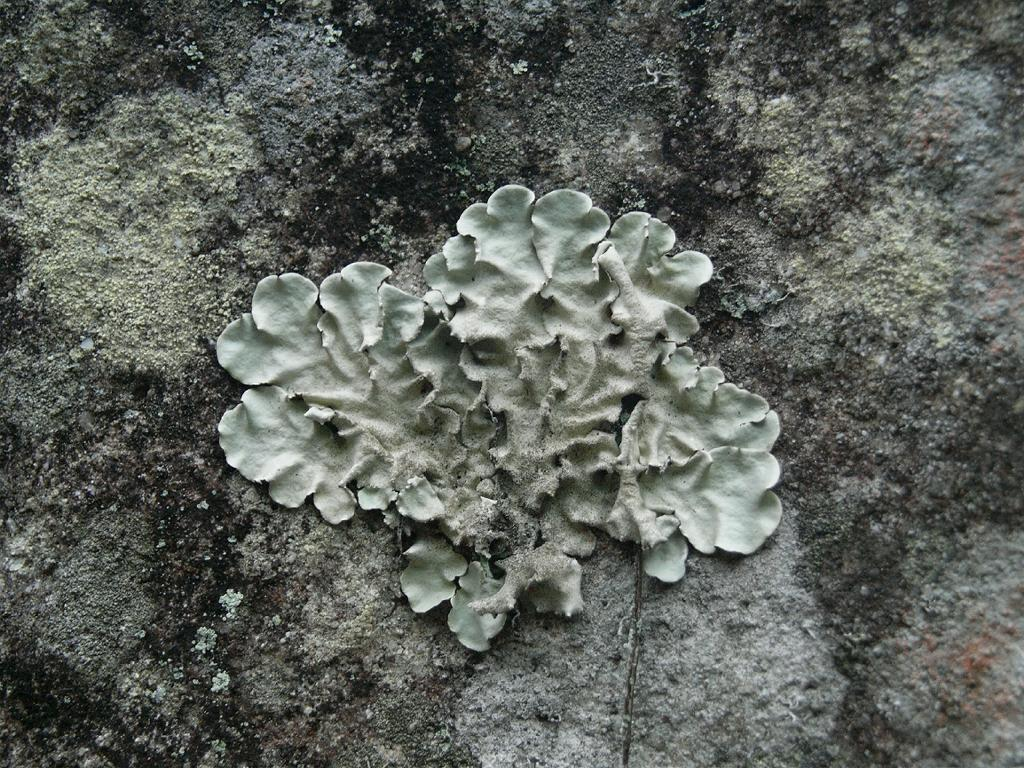

Conservation status
- Secure (NatureServe)

Scientific classification
- Kingdom: Fungi
- Division: Ascomycota
- Class: Lecanoromycetes
- Order: Lecanorales
- Family: Parmeliaceae
- Genus: Parmotrema
- Species: P. tinctorum

Binomial name
- Parmotrema tinctorum Hale 1974

= Parmotrema tinctorum =

Species of lichen

Parmotrema tinctorum, also known as the palm ruffle lichen, belongs to the Parmotrema genus. It is listed as secure by the Nature Conservatory.

== Description ==
This lichen grows to around 3–30 cm in diameter, with broad dull smooth slightly shiny gray lobes that are 10–20 mm wide. The underside is black with naked brown areas, and a central collection of simple rhizines.

== Habitat and range ==
This lichen has global distribution, with a majority of samples being located in North America and Europe.

== Chemistry ==
Compounds derived from Parmotrema tinctorum have been found to have anti-cancer properties.

== Environmental monitoring ==
Parmotrema tinctorum has been identified and used as a candidate for monitoring air pollution.

== See also ==
- List of Parmotrema species
