= Syo Kurokawa =

Japanese lichenologist (1926–2010)

- 黒川 逍
- Born: July 15, 1926
- Died: September 16, 2010 (aged 84)
- Education: Tokyo University of Literature & Science
- Known for: Study of lichens
- Awards: Acharius Medal
- Scientific career
- Institutions: National Science Museum, Tokyo
- Academic advisors: Yasuhiko Asahina
- Author abbrev. (botany): Kurok.

Syo Kurokawa (黒川 逍, Kurokawa Shō; July 15, 1926–September 16, 2010) was a renowned Japanese lichenologist and 1994 recipient of the Acharius Medal. He studied under Mason Hale and Yasuhiko Asahina.

== Education and career ==
Kurokawa graduated in 1951 from the Tokyo University of Literature & Science, which later became the University of Tsukuba. He earned his Doctor of Science degree with a thesis titled "The species of Anaptychia, with a new sub generic classification". This work was later published as "A monograph of the genus Anaptychia" in 1962, which became a seminal paper in the field.

Throughout his career, Kurokawa made significant contributions to lichenology. He collaborated with Mason Hale on "Studies on Parmelia subgenus Parmelia" (1964), which revolutionized the understanding of rhizine characteristics in Parmelia classification. His research encompassed various lichen genera in Japan, including Anzia, Cetraria, Parmelia, Peltigera, Pilophorus, and Xanthoparmelia.

== Contributions to lichenology ==
Kurokawa played a crucial role in elevating the herbarium of the National Museum of Nature and Science (TNS) to international standards. From 1966 to 1996, he published the exsiccata "Lichenes rariores et critici exsiccati" ("Rare and critical lichens, dried specimens"), comprising 700 specimens distributed to leading world herbaria. Between 1966 and 1987, he edited this exsiccata, collaborating with Hiroyuki Kashiwadani from 1978 onwards.

His research extended to environmental studies, where he investigated the use of Parmotrema tinctorum as a bioindicator for air pollution in urban Japan. Kurokawa's work earned him recognition as one of the most prominent lichenologists in Japan and Asia.

== Legacy ==
Kurokawa was widely respected for both his academic achievements and his personal qualities, including his warmth and kindness. His passing in 2010 was considered a significant loss to the global lichenological community.

=== Eponyms ===
Several lichen species have been named to honour Kurokawa. These eponyms include: Usnea kurokawae Asahina (1956); Parmelia kurokawae Hale (1968); Lobaria kurokawae Yoshim (1971); Physconia kurokawae Kashiw (1975); Cetraria kurokawae Shibuichi & K.Yoshida (1982); Heterodermia kurokawae Trass (1992); Scleropyrenium kurokawae H.Harada (1993); Cladonia kurokawae Ahti & S.Stenroos (1996); Ramalina kurokawae Kashiw (1996); Parmotrema kurokawianum Louwhoff & Elix (1999); Fellhaneropsis kurokawae G.Thor, Lücking & Tat.Matsumoto (2000); Graphis kurokawae M.Nakan., Kashiw. & K.H.Moon (2008); and Lecanora kurokawae Shiba, K.H.Moon & Kashiw (2008). The genus Kurokawia is also named for him.

== See also ==
- List of mycologists
- Category:Taxa named by Syo Kurokawa
