= Punctelia jujensis =

Scientific classification
- Domain: Eukaryota
- Kingdom: Fungi
- Division: Ascomycota
- Class: Lecanoromycetes
- Order: Lecanorales
- Family: Parmeliaceae
- Genus: Punctelia
- Species: P. jujensis

Binomial name
- Punctelia jujensis Adler (1989)

Species of lichen

Punctelia jujensis is a species of foliose lichen in the family Parmeliaceae. It is found in Argentina and Brazil.

== Taxonomy ==
The lichen was described as a new species by Argentinian lichenologist Mónica Adler in 1989. The type specimen was collected near the Yala River in Jujuy Province (Argentina), where it was found growing on the bark of a Populus tree on the side of a road. Punctelia jujensis is a member of a group of similar Punctelia species with a black lower surface and lacking soredia, isidia, lobules or lacinules; they are known as the "Punctelia microsticta-group".

== Description ==
The lichen has a light to dark grey thallus up to 10 cm (4 in) in diameter comprising lobes with somewhat rounded tips that measure 3–7 mm (0.1–0.3 in) wide. Pseudocyphellae are sparse and minute (less than 0.2 mm in diameter), and are evenly distributed on the thallus surface. The lichen does make any vegetative propagules–lobulae, squamules, soredia, nor isidia. The medulla is white, while the thallus underside is chestnut or black. The cortex contains atranorin, while the medulla has gyrophoric acid. The conidia are threadlike (filiform), measuring 9–15 μm. The type specimen did not have apothecia, and so ascospore measurements were not given. They were later determined to be ellipsoid in shape, typically measuring 15–21 by 9–13 μm, with an epispore (outer spore covering) of 1–1.5 μm.

Punctelia jujensis was reported from Brazil in 2010.
