= Hildur Krog =

Norwegian lichenologist

Hildur Krog (22 March 1922 – 25 August 2014) was a Norwegian lichenologist and university professor who made contributions to the field of lichenology, particularly in the areas of lichen taxonomy, chemotaxonomy, and floristics.

== Biography ==
Hildur Krog was born on 22 March 1922 in Søre Simostrada in Modum Municipality, Norway. She received her early education at the landgymnas (rural high school) in Voss Municipality in Hordaland. During World War II, in late April 1940, she experienced German air raids on Voss and fled to the mountains with her sister, where they reportedly nearly starved. In 1941, she completed her high school examination (Abitur) and began studying biology at the University of Oslo.

In 1946, she returned to her studies after the Norwegian scholar Eilif Dahl, who had secured a position as a university lecturer in Oslo, came back from England. Dahl had been a member of a Norwegian resistance group during the war and had been forced to flee from the Germans to England in 1943. While in England, he worked in naval intelligence, deciphering German military communications, but also found time for botany. Through Dahl, Krog became familiar with microchemical techniques for identifying lichen substances.

Dahl helped Krog pursue a chemotaxonomic topic for her Candidata realium (candidate of science, equivalent to a master's degree) thesis titled "Microchemical studies in Norwegian lichens". Her work was highly regarded. Krog eventually became a leading lichen chemotaxonomist and pioneered the use of thin-layer chromatography for taxonomic purposes in Scandinavia.

She died 25 August 2014.

== Career ==
In 1948, Krog accepted a position at the Arctic Research Centre in Anchorage, Alaska, where she also held a position as an applied geophysicist. During her free time, she collected lichens in the surrounding area.

In 1953, she married the Norwegian botanist Olaf Gjærevoll, who had come to America for a research project in the White Mountains in central New River District, Alaska. The lichen collections she made there formed the basis of her 1968 doctoral dissertation, "The macrolichens of Alaska" (equivalent to a Scandinavian Dr. philos. or German Habilitation academic degree).

During her years in Alaska, Krog became the mother of three children. In 1971, she was appointed curator at the Botanical Museum in Oslo and initially focused intensively on the lichen flora of Norway. During this time, she collaborated with Dahl to publish the work "Macrolichens of Denmark, Finland, Norway and Sweden" (Dahl & Krog 1973), which proved to be an important identification guide for lichens far beyond Fennoscandia.

In 1987, Krog was appointed professor.

== Scientific contributions ==
For 15 years, starting from 1969. she collaborated with the British amateur lichenologist Dougal Swinscow to study the macrolichen flora of East Africa. They undertook field collections as well as characterisation and revision of the limited existing lichen knowledge of the region, presented in 33 scientific publications and a book The Macrolichens of East Africa, British Museum (Natural History) in 1988. She also worked on the lichen flora of the Canary Islands together with her student Haavard Østhagen.

For Norway, she co-authored in 1994 a richly illustrated comprehensive treatment of foliose (leafy) and fruticose (bushy) lichens with her students Geir Hestmark, Jon Holtan-Hartwig, Ole H. Johll, Jern Middelborg, Halvard Østhagen, Einar Timdal, Per Magnus Tønsberg, and Winnem Booli.

== Accolades ==
Krog was awarded the Acharius Medal of the International Association for Lichenology in 1992 for her lifetimes achievements in lichenology. She was also a fellow of the Norwegian Academy of Science and Letters.

Several lichen taxa are named in her honour, including Krogia (a genus of corticolous lichens), and the species Leptogium krogiae, Dictyonema krogiae, and Usnea krogiana.

== See also ==
- Category:Taxa named by Hildur Krog
