= Lecanoric acid =

Names
- Preferred IUPAC name 4-[(2,4-Dihydroxy-6-methylbenzoyl)oxy]-2-hydroxy-6-methylbenzoic acid
- Other names Orsellinate depside

Identifiers
CAS Number	480-56-8
3D model (JSmol)	Interactive image
ChEBI	CHEBI:15871
ChEMBL	ChEMBL1451874
ChemSpider	89997
KEGG	C02868
PubChem CID	99613
UNII	D0M65TKS0F
CompTox Dashboard (EPA)	DTXSID60197384
- InChI: InChI=1S/C16H14O7/c1-7-3-9(17)5-11(18)14(7)16(22)23-10-4-8(2)13(15(20)21)12(19)6-10/h3-6,17-19H,1-2H3,(H,20,21) Key: HEMSJKZDHNSSEW-UHFFFAOYSA-N
- SMILES: CC1=CC(=CC(=C1C(=O)OC2=CC(=C(C(=C2)C)C(=O)O)O)O)O

Properties
Chemical formula	C_{16}H_{14}O_{7}
Molar mass	318.281 g·mol^{−1}
- Except where otherwise noted, data are given for materials in their standard state (at 25 °C [77 °F], 100 kPa). Infobox references

Lecanoric acid is a chemical produced by several species of lichen. Lecanoric acid is classified as a polyphenol and a didepside, and it functions as an antioxidant. It is an ester of orsellinic acid with itself.

The acid is named after the lichen Lecanora, in which it was discovered. The acid has also been isolated from Usnea subvacata, Parmotrema stuppuem, Parmotrema tinctorum, Parmotrema grayana, Xanthoparmelia arida and Xanthoparmelia lecanorica. A related compound, 5-chlorolecanoric acid, is found in some species of Punctelia.
