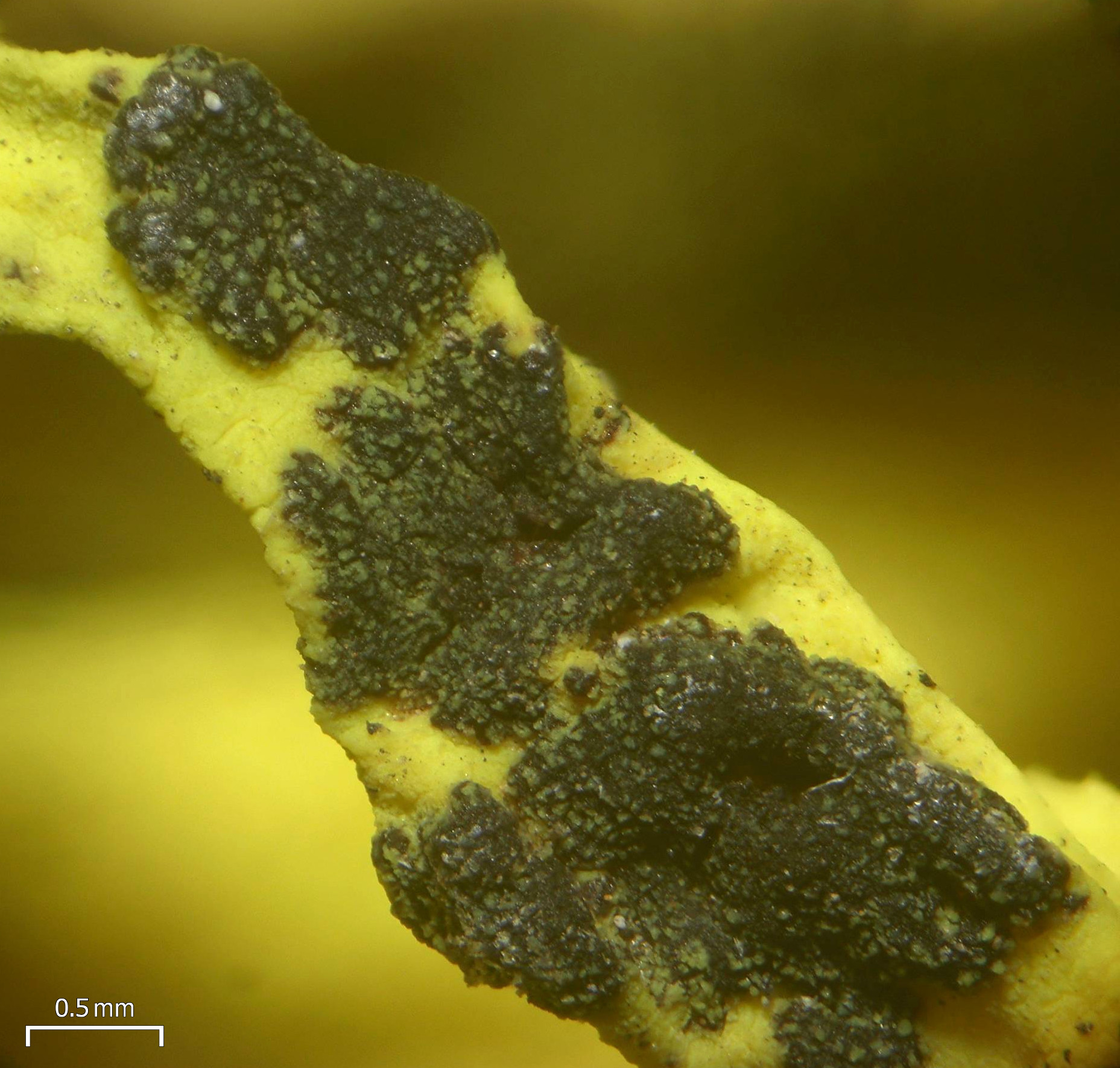
- Closeup of Phacopsis vulpina gall on Letharia sp.; scale bar is 0.5 mm

Scientific classification
- Kingdom: Fungi
- Division: Ascomycota
- Class: Lecanoromycetes
- Order: Lecanorales
- Family: Parmeliaceae
- Genus: Phacopsis; Tul. (1852)

Type species
- Phacopsis vulpina Tul. (1852)

Species
- See text

= Phacopsis =

Genus of fungi

Phacopsis is a genus of lichenicolous (lichen-dwelling) fungi. They are parasites of members of the large lichen family Parmeliaceae, of which they are also a member. Originally proposed by Edmond Tulasne in 1852 to contain 3 species, Phacopsis now contains 10 species, although historically, 33 taxa have been described in the genus. Many of the species are poorly known, some of them having been documented only from the type specimen.

Phacopsis species appear as partially immersed, shiny brown to black apothecia that cause gall-like deformations on the thallus of the host lichen. Features of Phacopsis used to distinguish species from each other include the shape of their spores, and the colour and reaction of the hypothecium (a tissue layer under the spore-bearing hymenium) when stained using an iodine–starch test. Since Phacopsis fungi are usually restricted to living on hosts belonging to a single phylogenetic clade, the identity of the host lichen is another diagnostic character used to identify species.

== Systematics ==
Phacopsis was circumscribed by French mycologist Edmond Tulasne in 1852 with multiple species originally classified in genus Abrothallus. Tulasne included three species: P. clemens, P. varia, and P. vulpina. The last-mentioned species was later selected as the type species by Frederic Clements and Cornelius Shear (1931), and by John Axel Nannfeldt (1932). Of the other two species originally included in Phacopsis by Tulasne, P. clemens has since been referred to the genus Arthonia, while P. varia is now known as Opegrapha physciaria.

In 1988, Dagmar Triebel and Gerhard Rambold proposed that Phacopsis should be considered synonymous with Nesolechia (another genus of lichenicolous fungi in the Parmeliaceae), owing to similarities both in the structure of their apothecia and the characteristics of their hymenia. This proposed synonymy, however, was not accepted by several authors in the years following, until 1995 when Triebel, Rambold, and John Elix showed that the supposed differences that separated the two genera were not consistent. Following this, Ove Eriksson and David L. Hawksworth used an expanded generic concept of Phacopsis (sensu lato) in the next update of their regular publication on ascomycete systematics, Systema Ascomycetum.

Molecular phylogenetic analysis published in 2015 demonstrated that the group of species then considered to be members of Phacopsis actually comprised three distinct lineages, representing three genera: Phacopsis, Nesolechia, and the newly circumscribed Raesaenenia. In 2017, Divakar and colleagues used a then-recently developed "temporal phylogenetic" approach in an attempt to make family- and genus-level classification more consistent with evolutionary history. They proposed to synonymize genus Nesolechia with Punctelia, and Raesaenenia with Protousnea, because the lichenicolous genera originated relatively recently and fell under the timeframe threshold for genus level. This proposed synonymy was not accepted in a later critical analysis of the temporal phylogenetic approach for fungal classification. In a 2018 review of taxonomic developments in the family Parmeliaceae, the authors recommended not synonymizing Nesolechia and Phacopsis, suggesting that the separation between these two genera has not yet been sufficiently established.

The higher-level classification of Phacopsis has changed several times in its taxonomic history. It has been placed in the order Arthoniales, in the families Graphidaceae, and the Acarosporaceae. Using electron microscopy, Josef Hafellner examined the asci (spore-bearing cells) of the type species P. vulpina, showing them to be similar to those commonly found in members of the Lecanoraceae, and so he considered the genus most appropriately classified in this family. This familial placement, however, was not corroborated in Triebel and colleagues' 1995 review and revision of the genus. Molecular phylogenetic analysis eventually revealed its true phylogenetic placement in the family Parmeliaceae. This relationship is an example of adelpho-parasitism, in which the host species is closely related to the parasite; this type of relationship is fairly common in the Lecanorales. The genus Protousnea has a sister taxon relationship with Phacopsis. It has been estimated that the lichenicolous Phacopsis diverged evolutionarily from the lichen-forming Protousnea during the Miocene (23.03 to 5.333 mya).

== Description ==
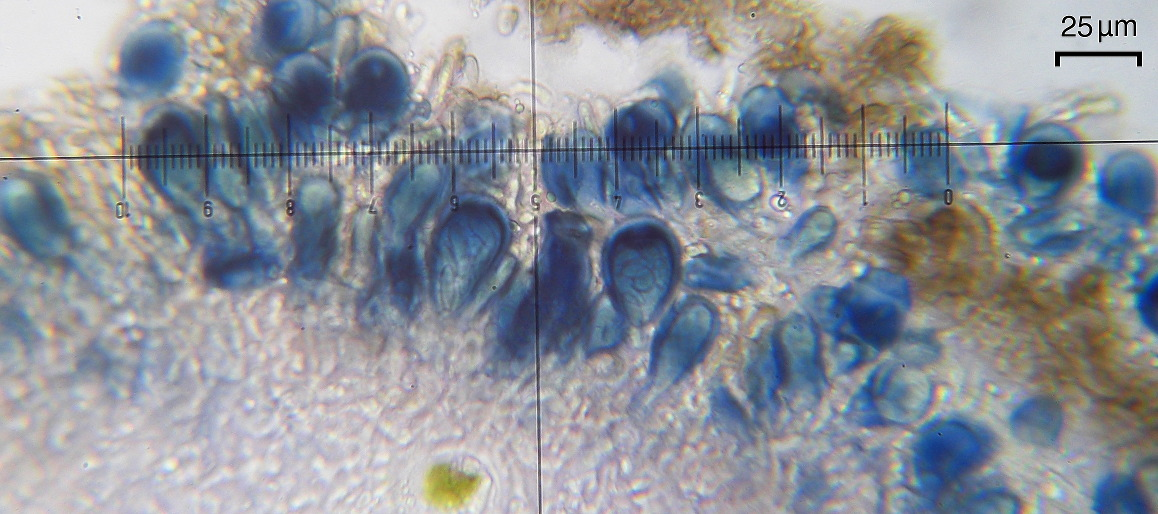
Microscopy of Phacopsis vulpina asci. Several spores are visible in some of the asci, and the non-amyloid zone above the axial body is visible in some instances.

All species are endokapylic, meaning they possess a thallus in which no morphologically distinct lichenized structure is formed. Their apothecia are circular to irregular in shape, and may be dispersed or aggregated. The excipulum (the outer margin of the apothecium) range from colourless to blackish-brown, and often comprises "a few rows of cells which may be difficult to recognize". The hypothecium (a layer of dense hyphal tissue just below the hymenium) is colourless to blackish-brown. In some species, the hyphae in the hypothecium have a violet staining reaction with an iodine–starch test; this characteristic can be used to distinguish between some species. The hymenium is colourless, pale brownish, or pale olivaceous. Asci are more or less club-shaped, and contain eight spores. They are surrounded by a thin outer amyloid wall layer and a thicker, non-amyloid inner wall layer; a non-amyloid zone rests above the axial body of the ascus.

The ascospores are colourless, lack septa, and have smooth walls with occasional thickening at either end. The spores have a range of shapes; depending on the species, the following shapes have been recorded: ellipsoid, ovoid (egg-shaped), fusiform (spindle-shaped), lemon-shaped, falciform (sickle-shaped), fabiform (bean-shaped), and partly curved. The pycnidia of Phacopsis are immersed in the thallus of the host. Pycnospores have a bacilliform shape.

== Distribution ==
Members of the host family, Parmeliaceae, are found worldwide and the family has centres of distribution in Asia and in the Southern Hemisphere; Phacopsis probably occurs wherever the host does. A 1995 survey of Phacopsis accepted 13 taxa (eight species and several varieties) found on 41 host species on 20 genera. Little is known about several Phacopsis species, and some have only been found at their type locality. The most southernly distributed member of the genus is Phacopsis usneae, known to occur only in southern Chile and Antarctica.

Like many lichenicolous fungi, Phacopsis species are usually restricted to living on a host belong to a single phylogenetic clade. In 2002, André Aptroot and Triebel suggested a possible close phylogenetic relationship between Paraparmelia and Xanthoparmelia, since Phacopsis australis was noted to grow on representatives from both of those lichen genera. Since then, molecular phylogenetic analysis has demonstrated that they are equivalent, and Paraparmelia is now placed in synonymy with Xanthoparmelia.

== Species ==
Phacopsis species are distinguished from each other by the characteristics of their ascospores, the colour and amyloid reaction of the hypothecium, and the identity of their host. According to Index Fungorum, 33 taxa have been described under the name Phacopsis (28 species and 5 varieties). A recent (2022) estimate places 10 species in genus Phacopsis. The following list of Phacopsis species indicates its name, taxonomic authority (standard abbreviations are used) and year of publication, type locality, and host species (or genus).

- Phacopsis australis Aptroot & Triebel (2002) – southern Africa; host=Xanthoparmelia
- Phacopsis cephalodioides (Nyl.) Triebel & Rambold (1988) – Denmark; host=Hypogymnia physodes
- Phacopsis lethariellae Hafellner & Rambold (1995) – Canary Islands; host=Lethariella intricata
- Phacopsis oroarcticae Zhurb. (2010) – Severnaya Zemlya; host=Brodoa oroarctica
- Phacopsis prolificans (Müll.Arg.) Triebel & Rambold (1992) – Japan; host=Platismatia interrupta
- Phacopsis rufa (Müll.Arg.) Triebel (1992) – Australia; hosts=Cetrelia and Punctelia
- Phacopsis thallicola (A.Massal.) Triebel & Rambold (1988) – New Zealand; hosts=Cetrelia sanguinea, Flavoparmelia caperata, Flavoparmelia praesignis, Parmotrema eurysacum, Rimelia cetraria
- Phacopsis usneae C.W.Dodge (1948) – Kerguelen Islands; host=Usnea trachycarpa
- Phacopsis vulpicidae Zhurb. & Diederich (2019) – Renchinlkhümbe (Mongolia); host=Vulpicida
- Phacopsis vulpina Tul. (1852) – France; host=Letharia

In 1995, Triebel and colleagues described Phacopsis menegazziae for a Nepalese fungus similar to Phacopsis oxyspora, but with smaller spore dimensions and growing on the host Menegazzia terebrata. Paul Diederich synonymised P. menegazziae with P. oxyspora in 2003, based on specimens he found growing on Menegazzia with ascospores similar in size to typical P. oxyspora. Phacopsis oxyspora (Tul.) Triebel & Rambold (1988) is now Nesolechia oxyspora (Tul.) A.Massal. (1856), the type species of Nesolechia.

Several species formerly placed in Phacopsis have since been transferred to other genera. These include:

- Phacopsis crustulosae Creveld (1981) now Gyrophthorus crustulosae (Creveld) Hafellner & Sancho (1990)
- Phacopsis doerfeltii Alstrup & P.Scholz (1998) now Nesolechia doerfeltii (Alstrup & P.Scholz) Diederich (2018)
- Phacopsis ericetorum (Flot. ex Körb.) Vouaux (1914) now Rhymbocarpus ericetorum (Flot. ex Körb.) Etayo (2010)
- Phacopsis falcispora Triebel & Rambold (1995) now Nesolechia falcispora (Triebel & Rambold) Diederich (2018)
- Phacopsis huuskonenii Räsänen (1948) now Raesaenenia huuskonenii (Räsänen) D.Hawksw., C.Boluda & H.Lindgren (2015)
- Phacopsis lesdainii Vouaux (1914) now Echinodiscus lesdainii (Vouaux) Etayo & Diederich (2000)
- Phacopsis macrospora Uloth (1861) now Cercidospora macrospora (Uloth) Hafellner & Nav.-Ros. (2004)
- Phacopsis muelleri Willey (1892) now Calloria muelleri (Willey) Seaver (1951)
- Phacopsis mulleri Willey (1892) now Skyttella mulleri (Willey) D.Hawksw. & R.Sant. (1988)
