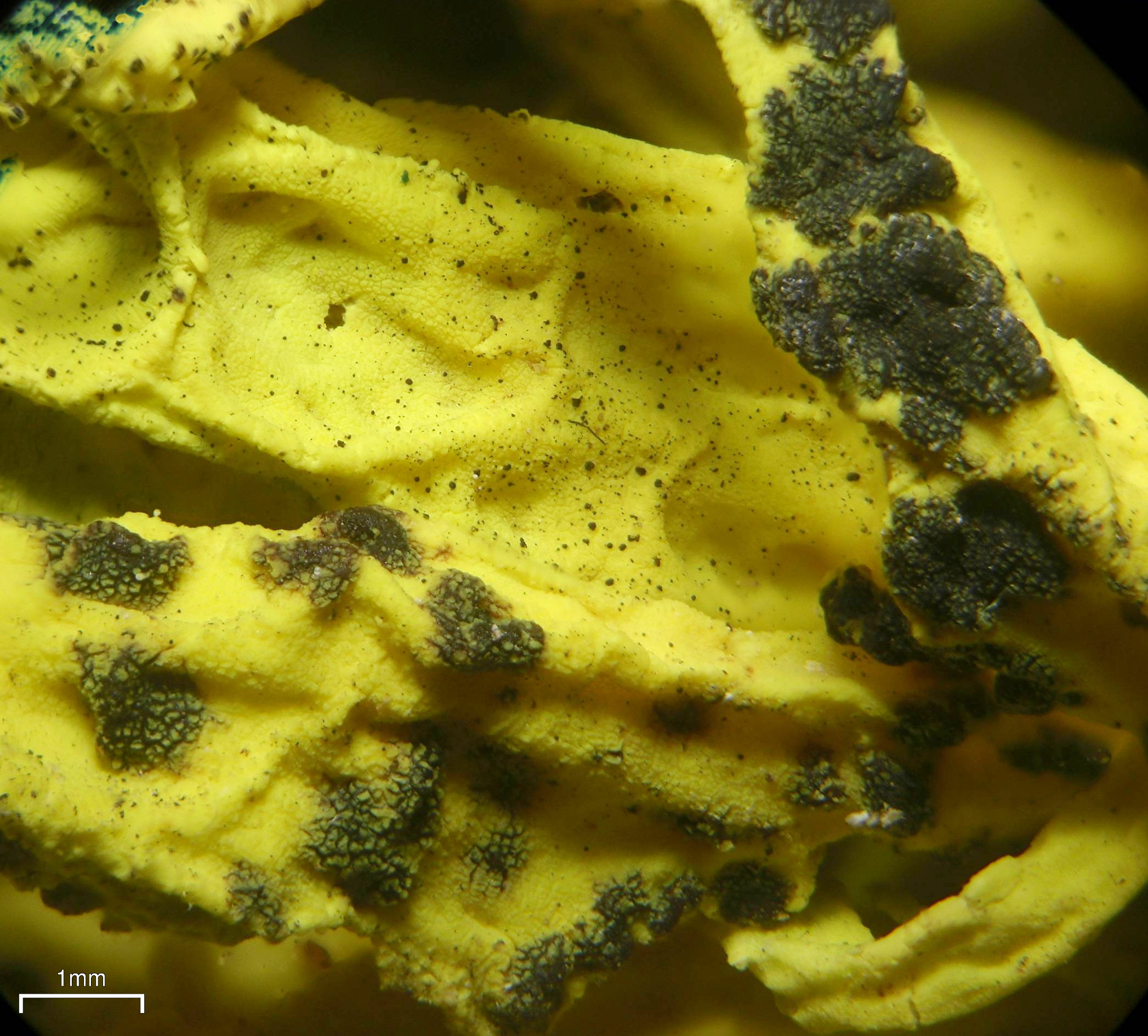
- Phacopsis vulpina galls on Letharia spp.

Scientific classification
- Domain: Eukaryota
- Kingdom: Fungi
- Division: Ascomycota
- Class: Lecanoromycetes
- Order: Lecanorales
- Family: Parmeliaceae
- Genus: Phacopsis
- Species: P. vulpina

Binomial name
- Phacopsis vulpina Tul. (1852)

Synonyms
- Agyrium vulpinum (Tul.) H.Olivier (1906)

= Phacopsis vulpina =

Species of fungus

Phacopsis vulpina is a species of lichenicolous (lichen-dwelling) fungus in the family Parmeliaceae, and the type species of the genus Phacopsis. It was formally described as a new species in 1852 by French mycologist Edmond Tulasne. The fungus is restricted to the genus Letharia as a host and consequently has a Northern Hemisphere distribution. Externally, it is somewhat similar in appearance to P. lethariellae, but P. vulpina does not have a brown hypothecium (the area of tissue in the apothecium immediately below the subhymenium).
