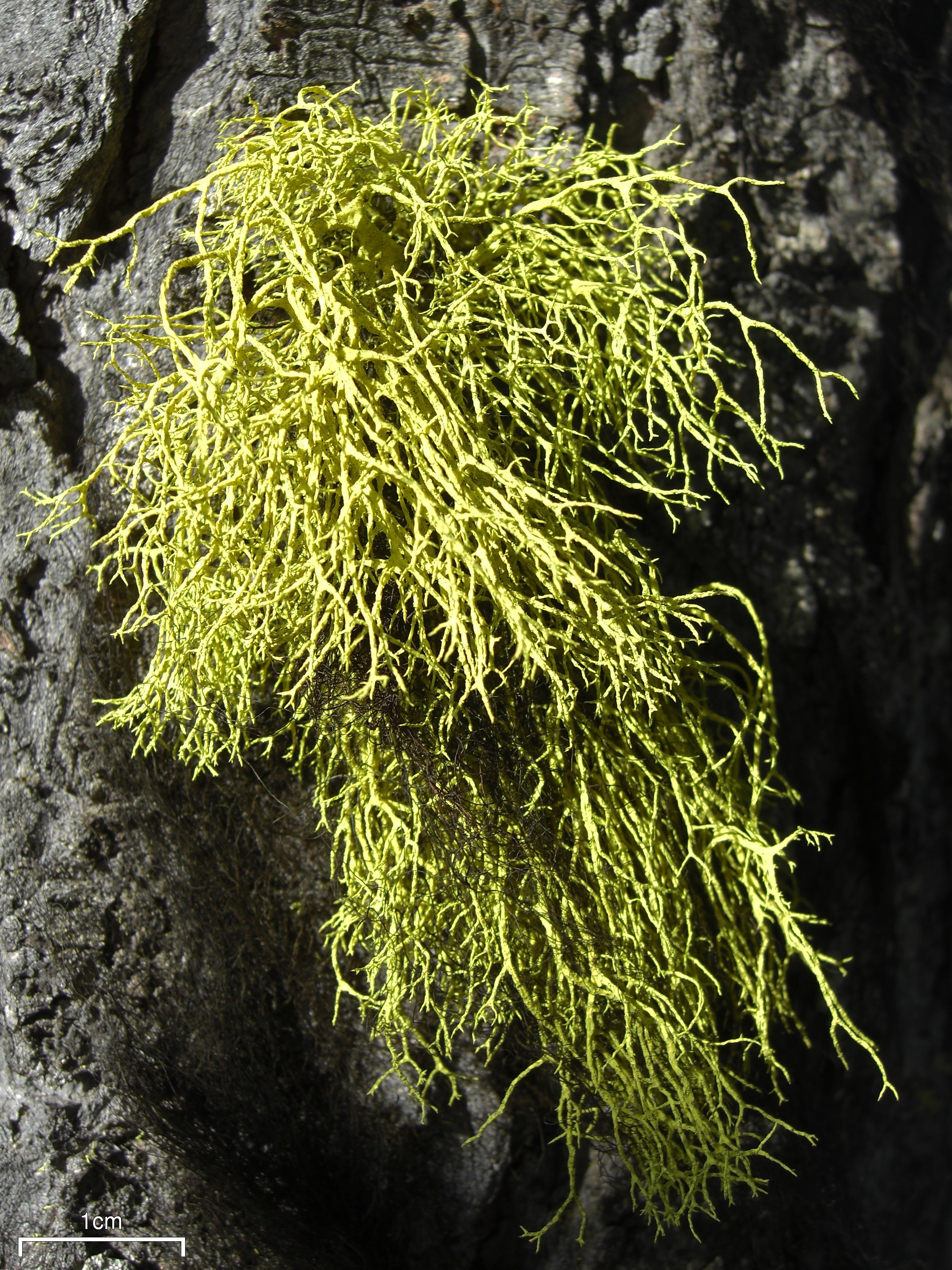
- In Wells Gray Provincial Park, British Columbia

Conservation status
- Unranked (NatureServe)

Scientific classification
- Kingdom: Fungi
- Division: Ascomycota
- Class: Lecanoromycetes
- Order: Lecanorales
- Family: Parmeliaceae
- Genus: Letharia
- Species: L. lupina

Binomial name
- Letharia lupina Altermann, S.D.Leav. & Goward (2016)
- Type locality: Umatilla National Forest, Oregon

= Letharia lupina =

Species of lichen-forming fungus

Letharia lupina is a species of lichen-forming fungus in the family Parmeliaceae. Commonly known as wolf lichen, it is a bright yellow-green, shrubby lichen that was split from Letharia vulpina in 2016 because, despite looking nearly identical, DNA evidence showed they are distinct lineages. It is widely distributed in western North America, where it grows on the wood and bark of conifers and other trees from valley floors to treeline. The thallus is rich in vulpinic acid, a toxic yellow pigment historically used in wolf baits in northern Europe. Outside North America, the species has also been recorded from Morocco and Switzerland.

== Taxonomy ==
Letharia lupina was described in 2016 by Susanne Altermann, Steven Leavitt and Trevor Goward, who split it from the traditionally broad concept of Letharia vulpina. DNA evidence from multiple loci consistently recovered two separate lineages within L. vulpina s. lat. (in the broad sense) that both reproduce by isidia and soredia. The separation of L. lupina was further supported by its association with a different clade of the green algal partner Trebouxia (within T. jamesii s. lat.) than that found in L. vulpina s. str. (in the strict sense), even where the two grow side by side. In the same study, the authors noted that L. lupina is more frequently encountered in North America than L. vulpina s. str. and has a broader overall range there. Earlier multilocus population-clustering analyses also recovered two distinct sorediate genetic groups within Letharia, corresponding to L. 'lupina' and L. vulpina. The authors reported that subtle morphological differences were consistent with this genetic separation. A separate multilocus study on Letharia in Morocco also recovered the same cryptic "lupina" lineage and found it genetically isolated from locally co-occurring L. vulpina.

The holotype was collected in the United States (Umatilla County, Oregon) in the Umatilla National Forest along Lincton Mountain Road at 1,354 m (4,442 ft) elevation, on wood, on 29 June 2006. The epithet lupina alludes to the long-standing common name "wolf lichen" and ultimately to historical use of Letharia thalli (rich in the toxic yellow pigment vulpinic acid) in wolf baits in northern Europe. Goward has also used a vernacular name "mountain wolf" for this species (and "timber wolf" for L. vulpina).

== Description ==
The thallus is shrubby and bushy (fruticose), often a vivid lemon yellow to chartreuse green, typically with darker brown to blackened branch tips and a paler (often whitish) base. Mature thalli are commonly 5–20 cm (2–8 in) long and 4–8 cm (1 9/16–3 1/8 in) wide, with coarse branches that are usually 1–3 mm wide near the base. Branches are round or more often angular-ridged in cross-section, irregularly branched overall but tending towards roughly equal (dichotomous) forking near the tips. The ridges bear pseudocyphellae (small pores or breaks in the outer skin, or cortex), which in turn usually carry small vegetative propagules (isidia) that may be sparse or dense. These are typically globular to weakly cylindrical and about 0.1–0.3 mm long, and may later be replaced by weakly corticate outgrowths (gymnidia).

Apothecia (fruiting bodies) are reported as rare and usually appear late in development, generally on large thalli. They are typically 0.75–1.50 mm across (occasionally larger), with a pale to dark brown disc that is strongly concave when young. The thalline margin is raised and inrolled when young and may have few (or no) short fibrils. The underside of the margin is strongly pitted and sorediate. Ascospores are simple, hyaline, ellipsoid, and measured at 5–7 × 3–4 μm. Pycnidia are also rare, and conidia were reported as straight and 7–9 × 1 μm. The cortex contains vulpinic acid and atranorin, and the hymenium of the apothecia contains norstictic acid.

== Reproduction and genetics ==
Genomic work on wolf lichens suggests that Letharia species are typically haploid and heterothallic (self-incompatible), with each thallus carrying only one of two mating type idiomorphs. In a wide survey of samples, researchers used PCR (polymerase chain reaction) to test for mating-type genes and found that North American populations of L. lupina include both mating types in roughly equal proportions, consistent with regular sexual reproduction even though apothecia are seldom produced. Long-read metagenomic sequencing has also produced a high-quality reference genome for L. lupina (about 49 Mb assembled into 31 contigs). In that same sample, analysis of sequencing depth and genetic variation indicated that the thallus contained at least two distinct fungal haplotypes, suggesting that individual thalli may sometimes include more than one genotype. Metagenomic sequencing of one L. lupina thallus, however, showed a triploid-like genetic signal; the authors interpreted this as evidence of hybridization between L. lupina and another Letharia lineage, and discussed several mechanisms that could generate such individuals. A targeted DNA screen for lichen-associated basidiomycete yeasts detected cystobasidiomycete yeasts in all three tested thalli of L. lupina; in the same assay, the two Tremella targets screened for were not detected in those samples. Culturing of surface-sterilised thallus sections has also yielded other lichen-associated fungi; in one study, a filamentous fungus identified as Anthostomella pinea was isolated from L. lupina material and later characterised with whole-genome sequencing. Genome mining of L. lupina has suggested extensive potential for secondary metabolism: one analysis of its published genome predicted 42 biosynthetic gene clusters, including 21 predicted polyketide clusters. The same study discussed prenyltransferase genes in lichen-forming fungi that are often annotated as dimethylallyltryptophan synthases, but argued (from comparative analyses) that most are more likely involved in modifying tyrosine- and polyketide-derived compounds than indole alkaloids, which have not been reported from lichens.

== Habitat and distribution ==
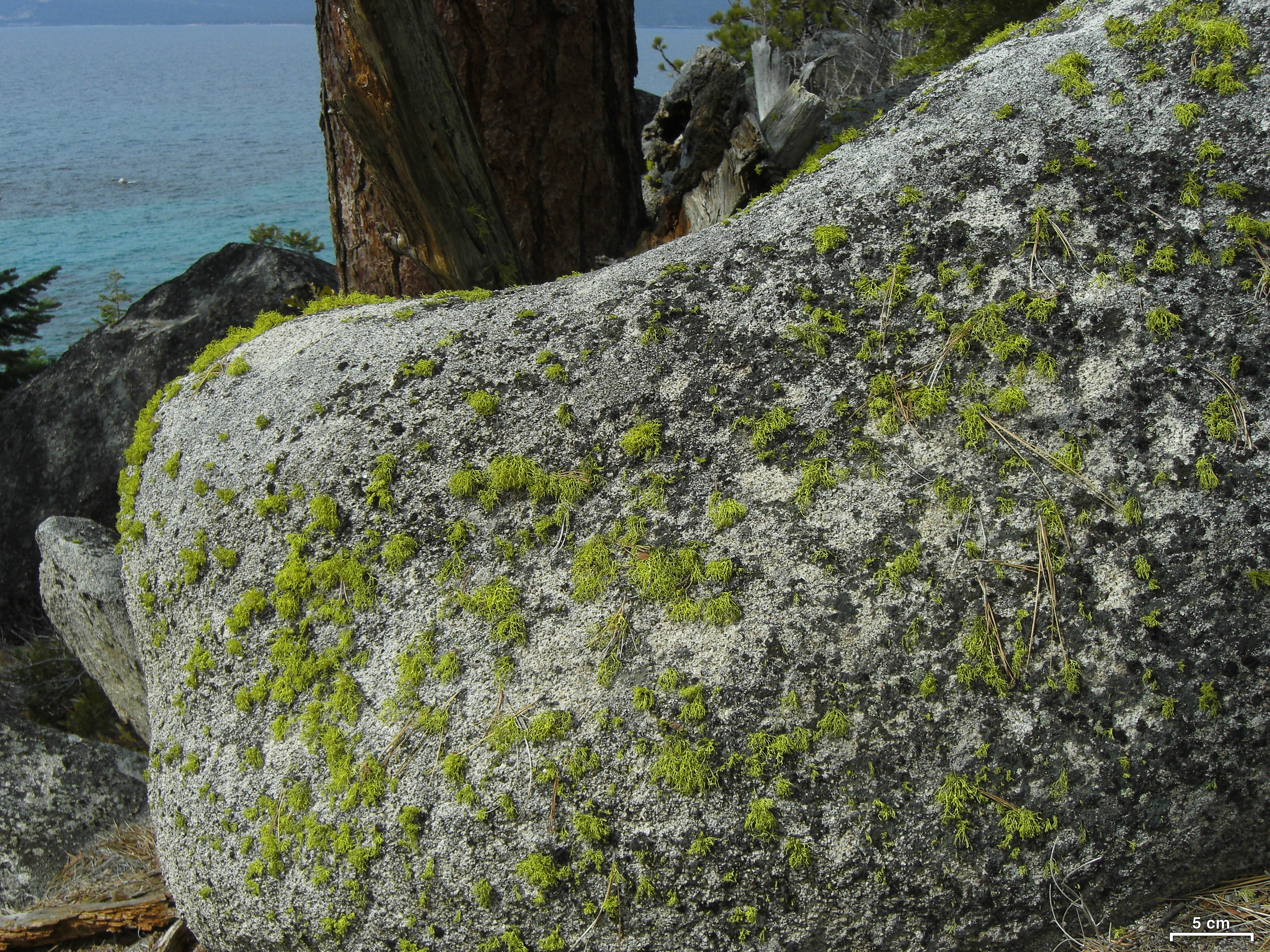
L. vulpina growing on rock in Lake Tahoe, Nevada

In western North America, Letharia lupina is widely distributed and, in the authors' assessment, is encountered more often than L. vulpina s. str.; sequenced material in their study identified L. lupina as the predominant lineage among North American samples. It is also the more widespread of the two lineages in North America, extending east of the Continental Divide into Alberta and Saskatchewan and southwards through parts of the interior western United States (including Montana, Wyoming, south-western South Dakota, Utah, and Nevada). In mountainous regions it spans a broad elevational range, from valley bottoms to treeline, roughly 190–3,370 m (620–11,060 ft). It has also been reported from Veracruz in eastern Mexico. In North America, the lineage later described as L. lupina was reported as most common in the interior western mountains, whereas L. vulpina more often occurs in warmer coastal mountains near the Pacific, although the two can occur together locally.

The species commonly grows on old fence posts and on the bare (decorticated) trunks and branches of conifers (especially Pinus), but also occurs on conifer bark, including that of Abies, Calocedrus, Picea, and Pseudotsuga. On hardwoods it most often colonizes exposed wood (reported from Arbutus, Arctostaphylos, Populus and Salix), but it has also been observed on bark-covered (corticated) branches of Betula and Quercus. Saxicolous (rock-dwelling) thalli have occasionally been found on granitic outcrops. Outside North America, it has been reported from the Atlas Mountains of Morocco (on Cedrus atlantica) and from Switzerland, with the Swiss photobiont belonging to the same algal clade as North American material.
