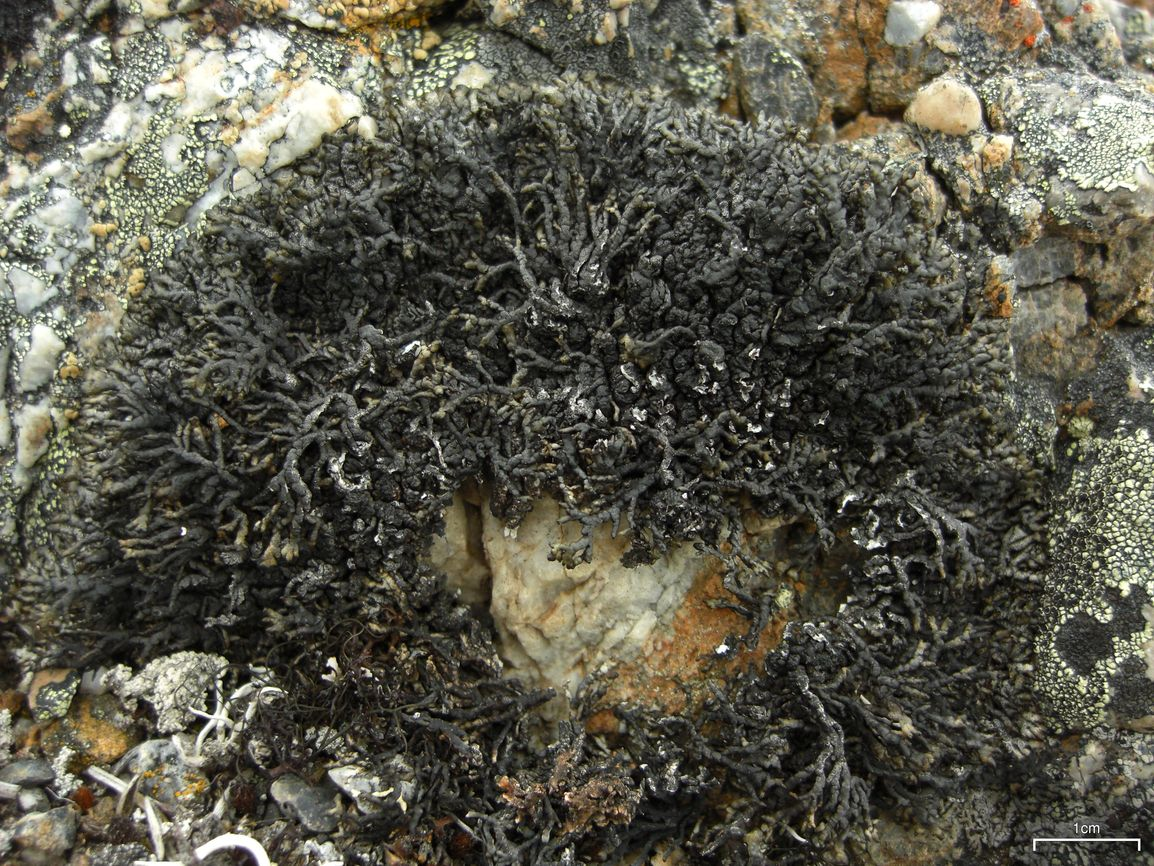

Conservation status
- Secure (NatureServe)

Scientific classification
- Kingdom: Fungi
- Division: Ascomycota
- Class: Lecanoromycetes
- Order: Lecanorales
- Family: Parmeliaceae
- Genus: Brodoa
- Species: B. oroarctica

Binomial name
- Brodoa oroarctica (Krog) Goward (1987)

Synonyms
- Hypogymnia oroarctica Krog (1974)

= Brodoa oroarctica =

Species of lichen

Brodoa oroarctica, commonly known as the Arctic sausage lichen, mountain sausage lichen, or rockgrub, is a species of rock-dwelling, foliose lichen in the family Parmeliaceae. First described in 1974 by the Norwegian botanist Hildur Krog, it is characterised by its dark grey, irregularly spreading thallus with narrow cylindrical lobes that grow loosely attached to rock surfaces. The species has a primarily circumpolar distribution across Arctic regions of the Northern Hemisphere, extending southward along the Rocky Mountains in North America, with notable disjunct populations in the White Mountains of New Hampshire, the Adirondack Mountains of New York, and the island of Newfoundland. It is distinguished from related species by its chemical composition, containing atranorin and physodic acid, and its preference for exposed Arctic–alpine habitats with limited snow cover. While common in its main Arctic range, its isolated southern populations are of conservation interest due to their rarity and potential vulnerability to climate change.

== Taxonomy ==
Brodoa oroarctica is a species of lichen that was first described by the Norwegian botanist Hildur Krog in 1974. She described it while studying the taxonomy of European Hypogymnia species with solid medulla, a group that had been a persistent source of confusion for lichenologists. Initially, she named it Hypogymnia oroarctica after studying specimens from Alaska, Norway, and the Alps. The holotype specimen was collected from Lomfjorden, a fjord on the eastern coast of Spitsbergen (Svalbard), on August 14, 1931, by Per Fredrik Scholander. At the time, it was considered part of a group of similar-looking lichens called the Hypogymnia intestiniformis complex, which included two other species found in Europe.

In 1986, the lichenologist Trevor Goward proposed that these species were distinct enough to warrant their own genus, and erected the new genus Brodoa, naming it in honour of North American lichenologist Irwin Brodo. The separation was based on several distinguishing characteristics, including differences in morphology, spore size, cortical structure, substrate preference, ecology, and distribution patterns. B. oroarctica was designated as the type species for the new genus.

As a result, the species was renamed to its current scientific name, Brodoa oroarctica. It is the only member of the genus Brodoa found in North America, while its two close relatives, B. intestiniformis and B. atrofusca, are restricted to European mountains. Prior to Krog's work, specimens were sometimes misidentified as Allantoparmelia alpicola due to their morphological similarities, though these species can be distinguished through chemical testing.

The species can be distinguished from its relatives through chemical analysis of its compounds. B. oroarctica contains two main lichen substances: atranorin in its outer layer (cortex) and physodic acid in its inner layer (medulla). Sometimes it also contains a third compound, protocetraric acid, near the tips of its lobes. These chemical differences, along with subtle variations in growth patterns, help scientists tell it apart from similar-looking species.

The recognition of B. oroarctica as a distinct species marked an important advance in lichen taxonomy, as it demonstrated how chemical analysis could reveal previously overlooked differences between North American and European lichens that appear similar to the naked eye. The establishment of the genus Brodoa further refined the classification of these lichens, recognising their unique combination of characteristics that set them apart from related genera.

The species is sometimes known by the common name "Arctic sausage lichen", referring to its solid cylindrical lobes and its primary distribution in Arctic regions. "Mountain sausage lichen" and "rockgrub" are other names used in North America.

== Description ==
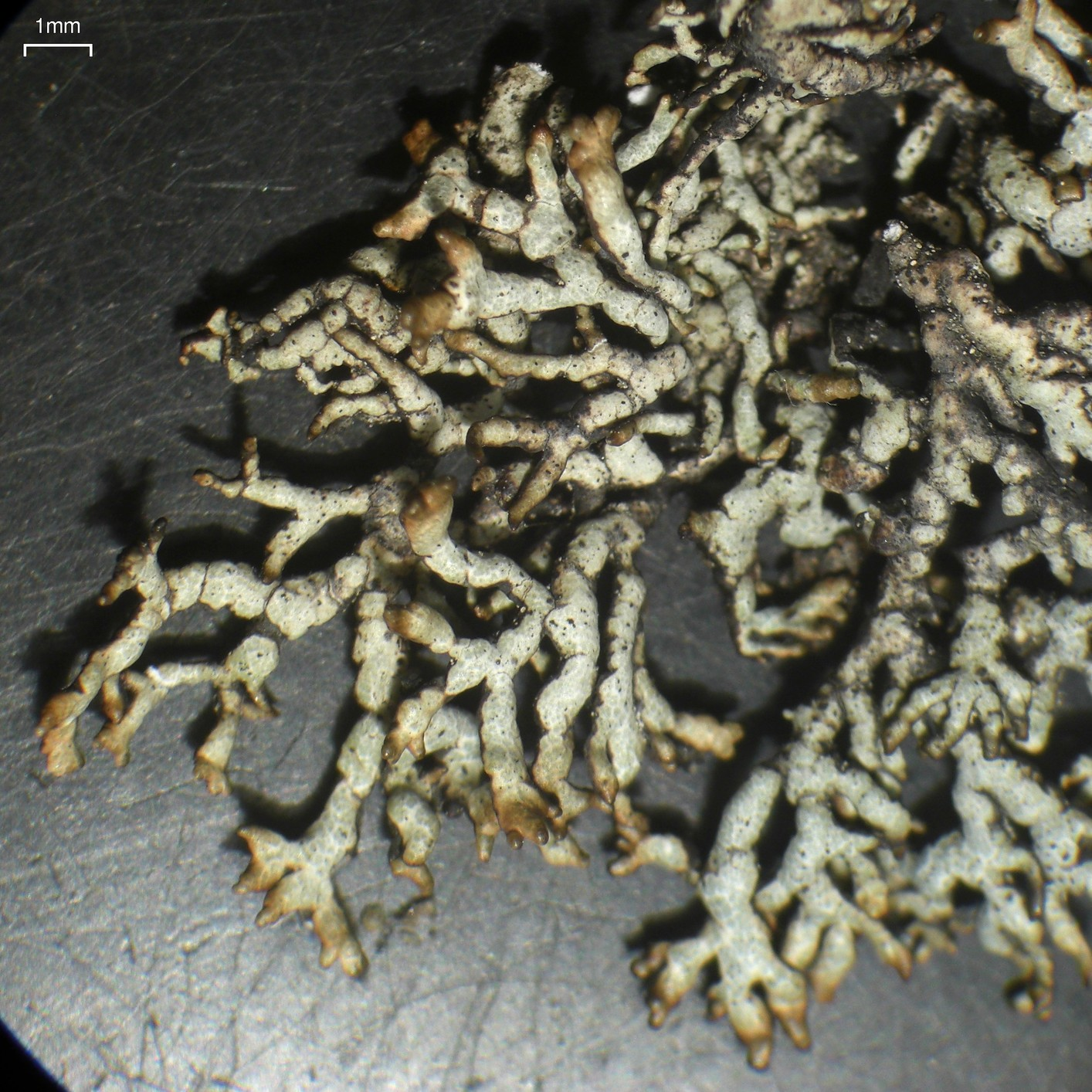
Brodoa oroarctica showing its characteristic pale grey, irregularly branching thallus with narrow cylindrical lobes. Scale bar = 1 mm

Brodoa oroarctica is a foliose lichen, meaning it has a leaf-like form, though it can also appear somewhat shrubby (subfruticose). The lichen forms thalli that can grow up to 6 cm (2.4 in) across, irregularly spreading and loosely attached to rock surfaces. Its most characteristic feature is its stiff, narrow lobes, which measure between 0.5 and 1 millimetre (mm) in width. These lobes are cylindrical and appear inflated, though they are actually solid throughout, and can be either touching each other, separate, or loosely overlapping as they spread in an irregular pattern across the rock surface rather than forming a circular pattern. The lobes are constricted at regular intervals, creating a nodulose form that resembles a string of sausages, alluding to the species' common name.

The upper surface can range in colour from pale grey to ash grey, brown, or almost black, and is distinctly areolate, with discontinuous patches of cortex interspersed with black cracks and lines. The colour varies depending on the amount of sunlight exposure the lichen receives. The upper surface features a characteristic maculate pattern of pale spots. The lower surface is black, becoming brown towards the lobe tips. The internal structure includes a white medulla throughout, and its upper surface layer (cortex) is composed of a tissue type called paraplectenchyma covered by a thin polysaccharide-like layer. The lower surface has a different structure, with a distinctive palisade plectenchyma arrangement and lacks the polysaccharide-like covering. The lichen lacks rhizines.

While the species does not produce specialised vegetative structures like soredia or isidia, and lacks holes in its surface, it can occasionally develop regeneration lobules. Unlike some similar species that frequently produce apothecia (fruiting bodies), B. oroarctica rarely develops these features. When present, the apothecia are situated on the surface of the thallus (laminal), reaching up to 5 mm (0.2 in) in diameter, with dark brown discs and narrow, even margins. The spores are more or less spherical to broadly ellipsoid, measuring 8–10 by 12 μm, with eight spores per ascus. The species also produces small asexual reproductive structures called pycnidia, which are black and embedded in the upper surface of the lichen.

=== Chemistry ===
The species exhibits characteristic spot test reactions: cortex K+ (yellow) (atranorin), medulla KC+ (pink) (physodic acid), and sometimes PD+ (orange) near the lobe tips (protocetraric acid). These chemical characteristics help distinguish B. oroarctica from similar-looking species. For example, while the related European species Brodoa atrofusca shares some of these chemical properties, it grows in a more organised, circular pattern. Two other species that might be confused with B. oroarctica in North America, Allantoparmelia alpicola and A. almquistii, contain entirely different chemical compounds and can be definitively distinguished through chemical testing.

== Habitat and distribution ==
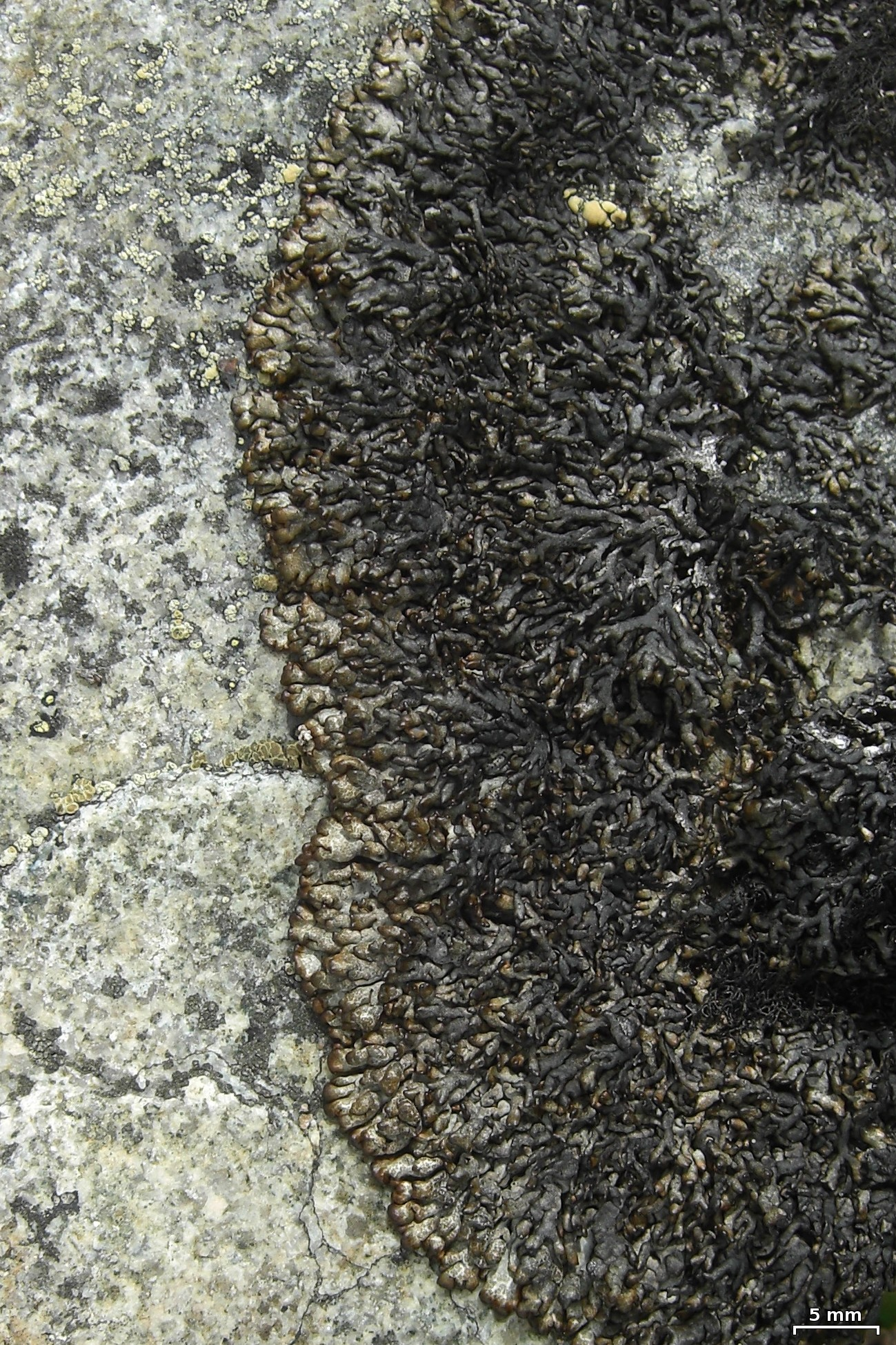
Brodoa oroarctica growing on rock in Raft Mountain, British Columbia, showing its typical growth pattern on exposed alpine substrate. Scale bar = 5mm

Brodoa oroarctica is an Arctic–alpine species with a circumpolar distribution. Its main range extends throughout Arctic regions, including Iceland, Fennoscandia, Svalbard, northern Russia (from the Polar Urals to Severnaya Zemlya), northern Canada, Greenland, and Alaska. In Greenland, it occurs in Johannes V. Jensen Land, which is the northernmost arctic land area. In North America, it extends southward along the Rocky Mountains. The species has also been documented in high-elevation sites in the Altai Mountains of northwestern China and, notably, in northern Greece above 1,750 m (5,740 ft).

It is saxicolous, growing on rock surfaces in exposed Arctic and alpine environments, and sometimes overgrowing neighbouring mosses. It grows on exposed siliceous rock, although it was recorded growing on basaltic rock in Iceland. The species commonly grows alongside other Arctic–alpine lichens including Alectoria pubescens, Cetraria hepatizon, Parmelia omphalodes, and various Umbilicaria species. This association indicates its preference for habitats with low snow cover during winter.

The species is notable for having several disjunct populations in eastern North America, where it is relatively scarce compared to western mountains. This scarcity likely reflects the limited true alpine zones in the Appalachians and the more extensive historical coverage of continental ice sheets in eastern North America during the Pleistocene period. Verified populations have been documented in three locations: the White Mountains of New Hampshire, the Adirondack Mountains of New York, and most recently discovered in 2022, on the island of Newfoundland, Canada. The Newfoundland population, found at an elevation of 520 m (1,710 ft) above sea level, represents the easternmost known occurrence of the species in North America.

The Newfoundland site where B. oroarctica grows is characterised by Arctic–alpine barrens on granitic outcrops. Here, the species is found alongside other Arctic–alpine plants and lichens, including Diapensia lapponica, Thamnolia subuliformis, Flavocetraria cucullata, and Flavocetraria nivalis. The habitat consists of a mix of exposed rock surfaces, including large glacial erratics, interspersed with heath vegetation and scattered krummholz (stunted windswept trees).

Historical records of the species in the White Mountains and Adirondacks date back to the 1880s and 1933 respectively, though recent surveys have not documented new populations in these areas despite extensive lichenological research in eastern North America. A possible additional population in Quebec, Canada has been reported, but the exact location remains unclear and requires verification. The presence of these disjunct populations is significant from both ecological and conservation perspectives, as they may represent unique genetic variations of the species and could serve as potential refugia – areas where the species might persist during periods of climate change.

== Conservation ==
The conservation status of Brodoa oroarctica warrants particular attention due to its disjunct population pattern and Arctic–alpine habitat requirements. While the species maintains a broad circumpolar distribution in its main Arctic range, its isolated southern populations in eastern North America are of special conservation interest.

These disjunct populations are particularly significant because they may harbour unique genetic diversity separate from the main Arctic populations. Conservation biologists recognise such isolated populations as potentially important for species resilience, as they might serve as either holdout populations or stepping stones that could aid the species' survival during periods of environmental change.

The status of the species' historical populations raises some concern. Despite extensive lichenological research in eastern North America over recent decades, no new populations have been documented in the White Mountains or Adirondacks since the original collections from the 1880s and 1933. The 2022 discovery of a population in Newfoundland represents the first verified eastern North American record in 90 years, highlighting the rarity of these disjunct occurrences.

The species' specific habitat requirements may make it particularly vulnerable to environmental changes. As an Arctic–alpine species restricted to high-elevation rock surfaces in its southern populations, B. oroarctica could face challenges from climate change, which may affect the environmental conditions that maintain these isolated alpine habitats. The Newfoundland population occurs in an area characterised by Arctic–alpine barrens, a habitat type that itself is of conservation interest in the region.

== Species interactions ==
Brodoa oroarctica serves as a host for at least one species of lichenicolous fungus (a fungus that parasitises lichens). Phacopsis oroarcticae, described from Central Siberia, is known to specifically target this lichen species, causing the host's lobes to become bleached, swollen, and sometimes contorted where infected. The fungus produces small (0.2–0.5 mm diameter), dark brown to almost black fruiting bodies on the lichen's surface. This parasitic relationship appears to be highly specific, as P. oroarcticae has not been found on any other lichen species, and is currently known only from its type locality in the Siberian Arctic, where it was first reported in 2010.
