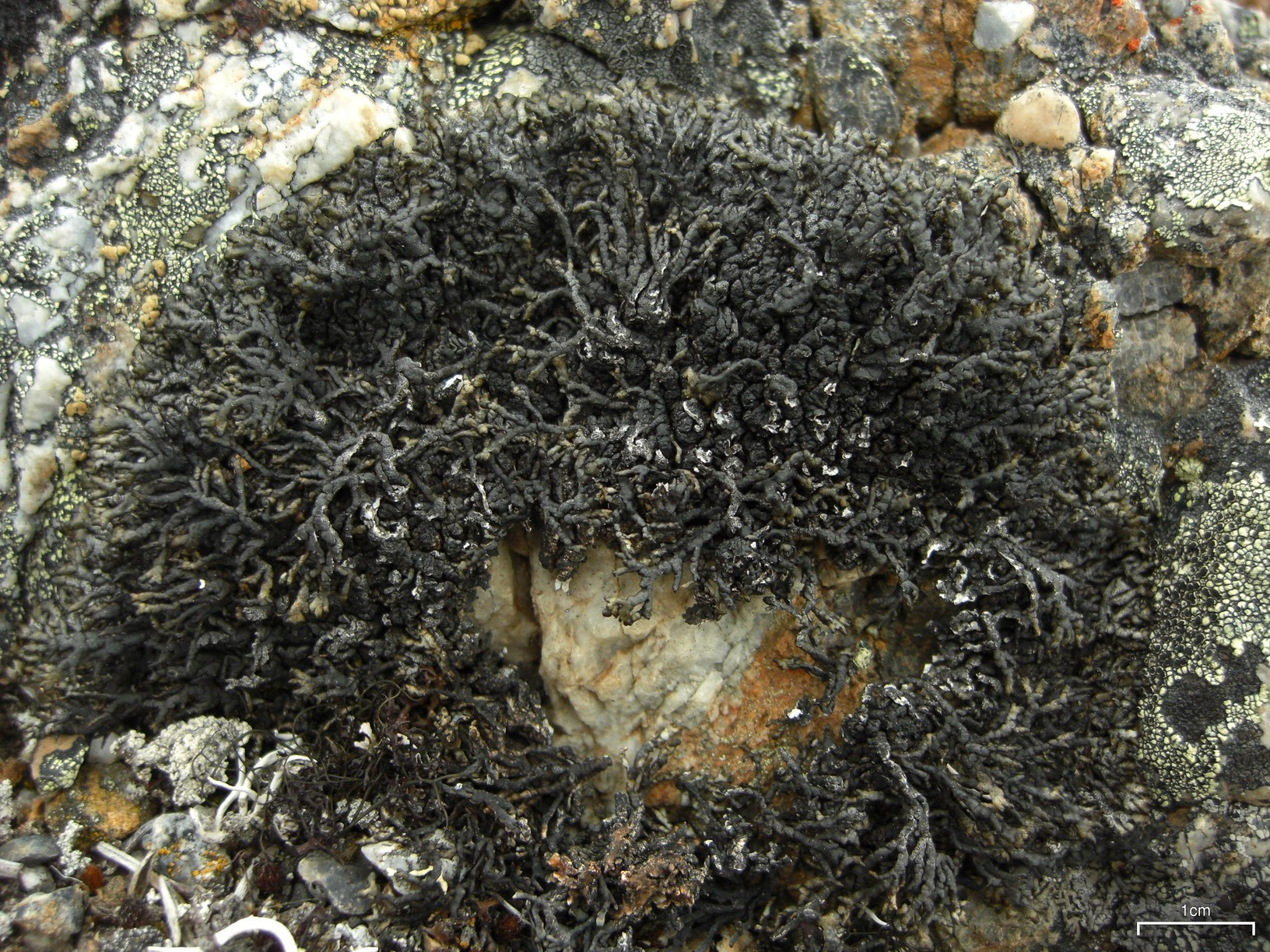
- Allantoparmelia alpicola

Scientific classification
- Domain: Eukaryota
- Kingdom: Fungi
- Division: Ascomycota
- Class: Lecanoromycetes
- Order: Lecanorales
- Family: Parmeliaceae
- Genus: Allantoparmelia (Vain.) Essl. (1978)

Species
- A. almquistii A. alpicola A. sibirica

Synonyms
- Parmelia subgen. Allantoparmelia Vain. (1909)

= Allantoparmelia =

Genus of fungi

Allantoparmelia is a genus of lichenised fungi in the large family Parmeliaceae. It is a genus of only three currently accepted species. All three Allantoparmelia lichens have a foliose growth form. They appear to be a very slow growing group of lichens, with a mean annual thallus diameter increase of only 0.23–0.35 mm per year.

== Description ==
Allantoparmelia is a genus of foliose (leaf-like) lichens that typically appear black, dark olive, or yellowish-brown. They grow tightly pressed against their rock surface, occasionally resembling crust-like lichens due to their closely adhering thalli. Instead of root-like strands (rhizines), these lichens use irregular, peg-like outgrowths of their cortex to stay attached. The lobe-shaped "leaves" are slightly rounded, flattened from top to bottom, and have a protective layer (cortex) on both their upper and lower surfaces.

The upper surface lacks any visible pores (pseudocyphellae) or powdery or grainy reproductive structures (soredia or isidia). Both the top and bottom cortical layers are formed of fungal filaments aligned perpendicularly to the surface and show no notable colour changes with common chemical tests (K–, N–). Inside the thallus, the photosynthetic partner is a green, rounded (chlorococcoid) alga.

The reproductive organs (apothecia) appear on the surface, standing out slightly and often have a dark brown to blackish disc. They are initially surrounded by a margin made from the same tissue as the main lichen body (the thallus). The spore-producing layer (hymenium) is colourless, and the asci—where spores form—each contain eight colourless, non-septate spores that range from ellipsoidal to nearly spherical.

Allantoparmelia also produces tiny, embedded structures called pycnidia that release minute, colourless, elongated spores (conidia) that may be slightly club-shaped. Chemically, these lichens are notable for containing two unique benzyl ester depsidones—unusual compounds not found in other foliose members of the Parmeliaceae. They favour exposed, silica-rich rock surfaces and are generally found in open, rugged environments.

Unlike related genera such as Hypogymnia and Brodoa, Allantoparmelia does not contain the common compound atranorin in its upper cortex, and it also differs in its tightly adhering growth habit and lack of rhizines. While Allantoparmelia is clearly related to the brownish foliose lichens within Parmeliaceae, its exact position in the family tree remains uncertain.

== Species ==
- Allantoparmelia almquistii (Vain.) Essl. (1978)
- Allantoparmelia alpicola (Th.Fr.) Essl. (1978)
- Allantoparmelia sibirica (Zahlbr.) Essl. (1978)

== Citations ==
=== References ===
- Crespo, A.; Lumbsch, H. T.; Mattsson, J. E.; Blanco, O.; Divakar, P. K.; Articus, K.; Wiklund, E.; Bawingan, P. A.; Wedin, M. (August 2007). "Testing morphology-based hypotheses of phylogenetic relationships in Parmeliaceae (Ascomycota) using three ribosomal markers and the nuclear RPB1 gene". Molecular Phylogenetics and Evolution. 44 (2): 812–824. doi:10.1016/j.ympev.2006.11.029. PMID 17276700.
- Hestmark, Geir; Skogesal, Olav; Skullerud, Øystein (May 2004). "Growth in the alpine saxicolous lichens Allantoparmelia alpicola and Melanelia stygia". Nova Hedwigia. 78 (3–4): 301–309. doi:10.1127/0029-5035/2004/0078-0301.
