= Nesolechia =

Nesolechia may refer to:

- Nesolechia (fungus), a genus of fungi in the family Parmeliaceae
- Nesolechia (moth), a genus of moths in the family Gelechiidae
