= Phacopsis australis =

Scientific classification
- Domain: Eukaryota
- Kingdom: Fungi
- Division: Ascomycota
- Class: Lecanoromycetes
- Order: Lecanorales
- Family: Parmeliaceae
- Genus: Phacopsis
- Species: P. australis

Binomial name
- Phacopsis australis Aptroot & Triebel (2002)

Species of lichen

Phacopsis australis is a species of lichenicolous (lichen-dwelling) fungus in the family Parmeliaceae. It is found in a few locations in South Africa, where it grows on the thalli of several species of the leafy lichen genus Xanthoparmelia. Unlike other members of genus Phacopsis, the fungus does not induce the formation of galls in its host.

== Taxonomy ==
The fungus was formally described as a new species in 2002 by lichenologists André Aptroot and Dagmar Triebel. The type specimen was collected from a farm in the Droekloof Mountains (Willowmore, Cape Province) at an altitude of 850 m (2,790 ft). Here it was found growing on Paraparmelia molybdiza, a foliose (leafy) and saxicolous (rock-dwelling) lichen that is now known as Xanthoparmelia molybdiza.

== Description ==
Phacopsis australis grows superficially (i.e., on the surface) on the thallus of its host. Unlike other members of the genus Phacopsis, it is cecidogenous, meaning it does not cause the formation of galls in the host. Its apothecia are dark brown to black, range from sessile to slightly immersed in the thallus, and measure 0.2–0.4 mm in diameter. The hypothecium (the tissue in the apothecium immediately below the subhymenium) is hyaline (colourless) to pale brown, measuring about 20–60 μm thick. The ascospores are ellipsoid to fusiform (spindle-shaped) and contain oil droplets; they typically measure 12–15 by 5.5–7 μm with a 0.5 μm-thick spore wall.

Known hosts for Phacopsis australis are all from the genus Xanthoparmelia: X. annexa, X. molybdiza, X. conspersa and X. incerta.

Lecanora lasalliae is quite similar in appearance to Phacopsis australis, but this lookalike lacks algae in its excipulum (the rim of tissue around the apothecia), and has larger ascospores.

== Distribution ==
Phacopsis australis is only known from a few collections, in Cape Province and in the Drakensberg region of KwaZulu-Natal. Although one of its hosts, X. conspersa, has a cosmopolitan distribution with many specimens having been studied, the fungus has not been recorded occurring out of South Africa.
