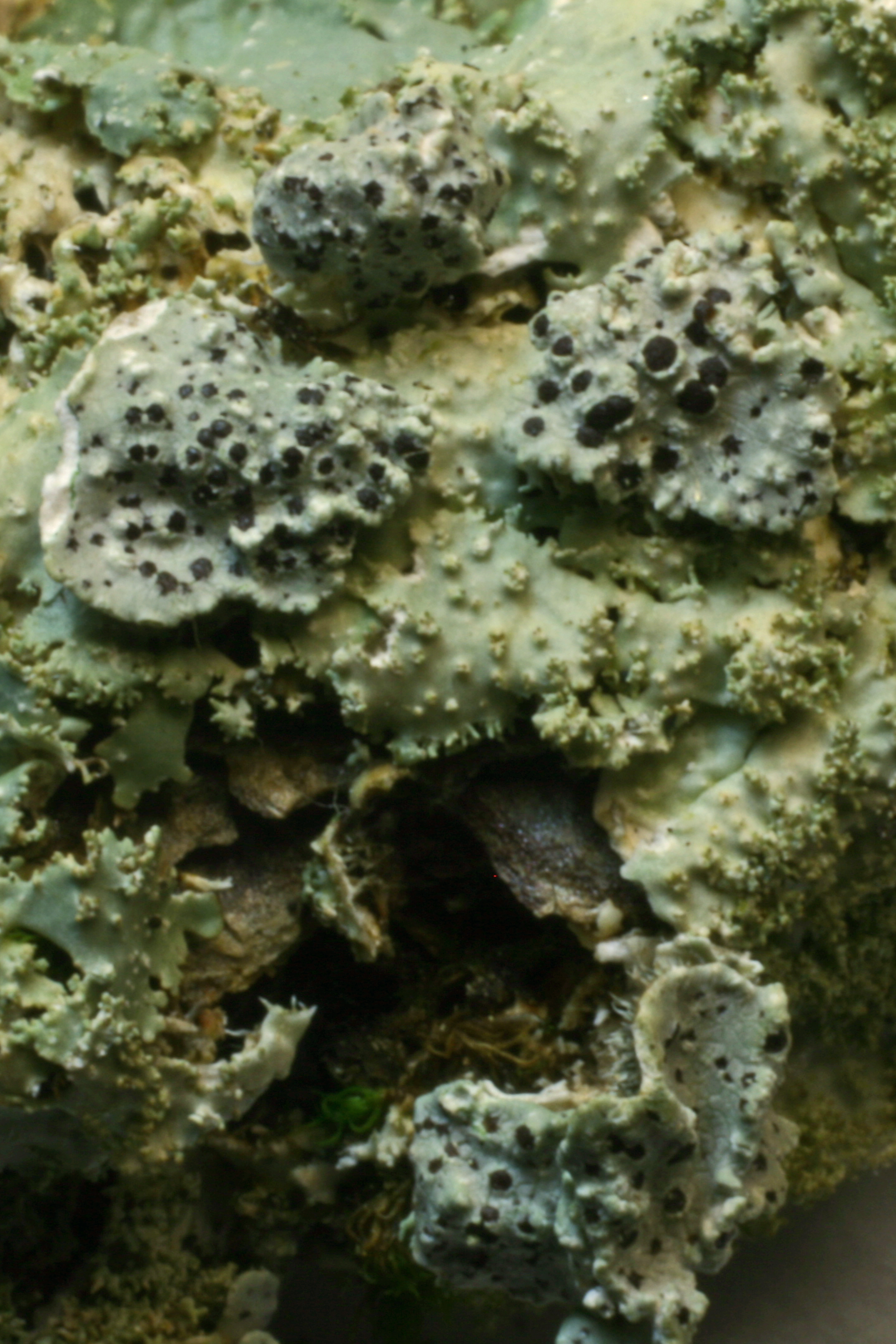
- Nesolechia oxyspora parasitizing Parmelia saxatilis

Scientific classification
- Domain: Eukaryota
- Kingdom: Fungi
- Division: Ascomycota
- Class: Lecanoromycetes
- Order: Lecanorales
- Family: Parmeliaceae
- Genus: Nesolechia
- Species: N. oxyspora

Binomial name
- Nesolechia oxyspora (Tul.) A.Massal. (1856)

Synonyms
- List: Abrothallus oxysporus Tul. (1852); Lecidea oxyspora (Tul.) Nyl. (1855); Epithallia oxyspora (Tul.) Nyl. (1855); Scutula oxyspora (Tul.) P.Karst. (1885); Biatora oxyspora (Tul.) Tuck. (1888); Phacopsis oxyspora (Tul.) Triebel & Rambold (1988); Phacopsis oxyspora var. fusca Triebel & Rambold (1995); Phacopsis fusca (Triebel & Rambold) Diederich (2003); Nesolechia fusca (Triebel & Rambold) Pérez-Ort. (2010); Punctelia oxyspora (Tul.) Divakar, A.Crespo & Lumbsch (2017); Nesolechia oxyspora var. fusca (Triebel & Rambold) Diederich (2018)

= Nesolechia oxyspora =

Species of lichen

Nesolechia oxyspora is a species of lichenicolous (lichen-dwelling) fungus in the family Parmeliaceae that parasitizes various foliose and fruticose lichens worldwide. First described in 1852, it has undergone numerous taxonomic reclassifications, with ongoing debate about its proper generic placement. The fungus produces spindle-shaped spores and forms small, dark fruiting bodies that develop within the host lichen's tissue before breaking through the surface. Studies have revealed significant morphological variations depending on the host lichen species, suggesting it may represent a complex of closely related species adapted to specific hosts. This cosmopolitan species is known to parasitize at least 63 different lichen species across 19 genera, occasionally inducing gall formations on its hosts.

== Taxonomy ==
The fungus was first scientifically described as a member of the genus Abrothallus by Edmond Tulasne in 1852. Abramo Bartolommeo Massalongo transferred it to Nesolechia in 1856. It has acquired about a dozen synonyms as it has been shuffled to various genera in its taxonomic history. The generic name Nesolechia was actually introduced by Massalongo in 1855, not just 1856 as commonly listed. He created the genus to separate species from Abrothallus that did not have brown single-septum ascospores. In 1856, Massalongo more precisely defined Nesolechia to include five lichenicolous fungi with specific characteristics and colourless ascospores.

The taxonomic placement of Nesolechia has been controversial. The genus was treated as a synonym of Phacopsis by Dagmar Triebel and Gerhard Rambold (1988), but this decision has not been universally accepted and many subsequent publications continued to recognize Nesolechia as distinct. Molecular studies using SSU nrDNA sequence data have placed N. oxyspora in the same clade as Xanthoparmelia conspersa in the family Parmeliaceae, which was unexpected for a lichenicolous fungus.

In 2017, Divakar and colleagues used a then-recently developed "temporal phylogenetic" approach to identify temporal bands for specific taxonomic ranks in the family Parmeliaceae, suggesting that groups of species that diverged within the time window of 29.45–32.55 million years ago represent genera. They proposed to synonymize genus Nesolechia with Punctelia (its lichen-forming sister group), because Nesolechia originated relatively recently and fell under the timeframe threshold for genus level. This proposed synonymy was not accepted in a later critical analysis of the temporal phylogenetic approach for fungal classification. Despite this, the synonym Punctelia oxyspora is still used by some sources.

== Description ==
The spores, measuring 14–22 by 5–7 μm, are spindle-shaped. The epithecium is chestnut brown, and the hymenium turns blue when treated with iodine (J+). The ascomata (fruiting bodies), which are 0.1–0.4 mm in size, form dense clusters. Initially, they develop inside the lichen thallus, but eventually break through the cortex and slightly protrude. The disc starts off flat with a fine margin, then becomes slightly convex and marginless, with a dull black-brown colour. Studies have revealed considerable variation in spore morphology depending on the host lichen species. When growing on different genera of parmelioid lichens, the fungus produces spores with statistically significant differences in their length-to-breadth ratios. For example, spores from specimens on Parmelia saxatilis have an average length-to-breadth ratio of 3.12, while those on Platismatia glauca average only 2.25. This variation suggests that N. oxyspora may represent a complex of closely related species or strains, each adapted to specific host genera. The colour of the hypothecium (the tissue layer beneath the spore-producing cells) also varies from very pale tan to brown depending on the thickness of the sections examined, and rarely stains positively with iodine.

The morphological features of N. oxyspora can be measured in detail across different host species. The average spore length ranges from 13.5–19.2 μm and breadth from 5.6–7.1 μm, with considerable variation within and between populations. When the fungus infects certain host lichens, it can induce the formation of galls—abnormal tissue growths that represent the host's response to infection. The fruiting bodies (ascomata) develop in dense clusters and are initially hidden within the host's tissue layer (thallus) before emerging through the protective upper surface (cortex). The spore-producing layer (hymenium) consistently turns blue when treated with iodine, which is an important diagnostic feature for identification.

Several related species occur on similar parmelioid lichens and can be distinguished by their spore characteristics. Phacopsis cephalothecoides, which grows on Hypogymnia physodes, has smaller spores (9–12 by 4–7 μm) that are not curved. Phacopsis doerfeltii on Arctoparmelia centrifuga has shorter, broadly ellipsoid spores. Phacopsis prolificans has narrowly fusiform spores, while Phacopsis thallicola has short, almost rounded spores. These species were previously classified together but show distinctive morphological characteristics and host preferences that suggest they represent different evolutionary lineages adapted to specific lichen hosts.

== Habitat and distribution ==
This fungus species appears to be cosmopolitan in distribution. It is found on the thalli of various foliose (leaf-like) and fruticose (shrub-like) lichens, where it sometimes induces the formation of galls.
