= Phacopsis oroarcticae =

Scientific classification
- Domain: Eukaryota
- Kingdom: Fungi
- Division: Ascomycota
- Class: Lecanoromycetes
- Order: Lecanorales
- Family: Parmeliaceae
- Genus: Phacopsis
- Species: P. oroarcticae

Binomial name
- Phacopsis oroarcticae Zhurb. (2010)

Species of lichen

Phacopsis oroarcticae is a species of lichenicolous (lichen-dwelling) fungus in the family Parmeliaceae. It was formally described as a new species in 2010 by Russian mycologist Mikhail P. Zhurbenko. The type specimen was collected from a stony polar desert in the Severnaya Zemlya Archipelago in Central Siberia, where it was found growing on the lobes of the foliose lichen Brodoa oroarctica; the species epithet refers to its host. Infection by the fungus results in bleached, swollen, and sometimes contorted lobes. It is the first Phacopsis species known to have Brodoa as a host.
