= Raesaenenia =

Scientific classification
- Kingdom: Fungi
- Division: Ascomycota
- Class: Lecanoromycetes
- Order: Lecanorales
- Family: Parmeliaceae
- Genus: Raesaenenia; D.Hawksw., Boluda & H.Lindgr. (2015)
- Species: R. huuskonenii

Binomial name
- Raesaenenia huuskonenii (Räsänen) D.Hawksw., C.Boluda & H.Lindgren (2015)

Synonyms
- Phacopsis huuskonenii Räsänen (1948); Protousnea huuskonenii (Räsänen) Divakar, A.Crespo & Lumbsch (2017)

Single-species fungal genus

Raesaenenia is a fungal genus in the large family Parmeliaceae. It is a monotypic genus, containing the single lichenicolous fungus Raesaenenia huuskonenii, which parasitises lichens of genus Bryoria in the Northern Hemisphere.

== Taxonomy ==
The genus was circumscribed in 2015 by David Leslie Hawksworth, Carlos Boluda, and Hanna Lindgren. The generic name honours Finnish lichenologist Veli Räsänen, who described the type species as Phacopsis huuskonenii in 1948. The type specimen was collected by botanist Avi Johannes Huuskonen from Pielavesi (North Savo, Finland), where it was found on the thallus of the lichen now known as Bryoria implexa.

In 2017, Divakar and colleagues used a then-recently developed "temporal phylogenetic" approach to identify temporal bands for specific taxonomic ranks in the family Parmeliaceae, suggesting that groups of species that diverged within the time window of 29.45–32.55 million years ago represent genera. They proposed to synonymize Raesaenenia with Protousnea, because Raesaenenia originated relatively recently and fell under the timeframe threshold for genus level. This synonymy was not accepted by Robert Lücking in a later critical analysis of this technique for lichen systematics, who noted that "if taxonomy and classification are to reflect evolutionary history, then merging them into a single genus just because of the point in time they diverged is certainly not justified".

== Description ==
Raesaenenia is characterized by having an ascus structurally similar to those of genus Phacopsis, but with somewhat cylindrical ascospores that have thickened caps of wall tissue at each end. Raesaenenia huuskonenii grows on Bryoria species in the Northern Hemisphere. Infection by the fungus results in blackened branches that are geniculately deformed (i.e., bent at a sharp angle).
