= Phacopsis vulpicidae =

Scientific classification
- Kingdom: Fungi
- Division: Ascomycota
- Class: Lecanoromycetes
- Order: Lecanorales
- Family: Parmeliaceae
- Genus: Phacopsis
- Species: P. vulpicidae

Binomial name
- Phacopsis vulpicidae Zhurb. & Diederich (2019)

Species of fungus

Phacopsis vulpicidae is a species of lichenicolous (lichen-dwelling) fungus in the family Parmeliaceae. It was formally described as a new species in 2019 by mycologists Mikhail P. Zhurbenko and Paul Diederich. The type specimen was collected by the first author near the headwaters of Ar Khordolyn gol River in Renchinlkhümbe Somon (Khövsgöl Province, Mongolia), at an altitude of 2,050 m (6,730 ft). There, in the upper limit of a Larix sibirica forest, the fungus was found growing on the thallus of a ground-dwelling Vulpicida juniperina lichen. The species epithet vulpicidae refers to the genus of its host. Infections by the fungus cause blister-like (bullate) swellings of the host thallus. It is known to occur in arctic and mountain tundra and taiga biomes of Asia, Europe, and North America (Alaska). Its only recorded host is Vulpicida juniperina, and almost all recorded host specimens have been terricolous.
