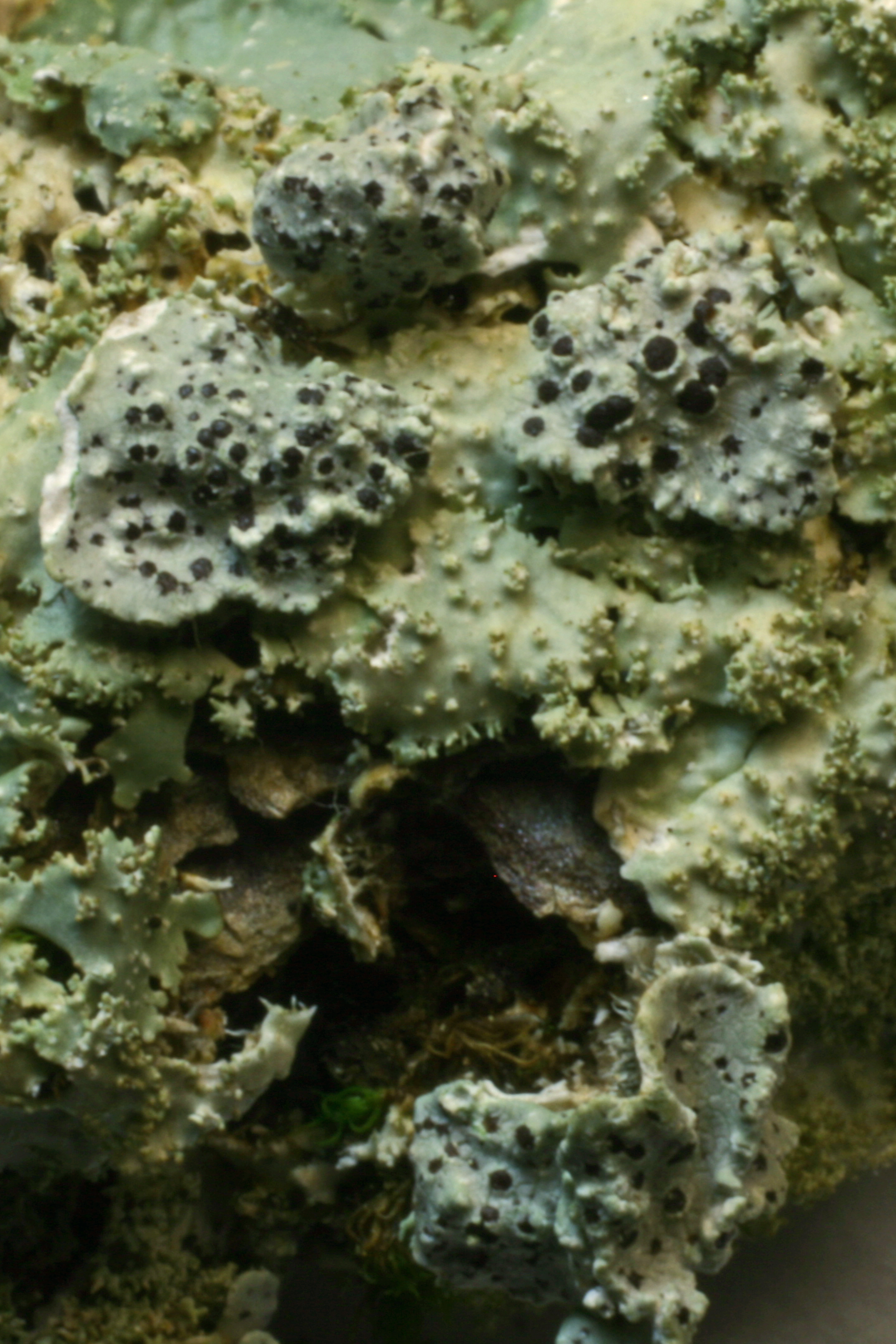
- Nesolechia oxyspora growing on Punctelia rudecta

Scientific classification
- Domain: Eukaryota
- Kingdom: Fungi
- Division: Ascomycota
- Class: Lecanoromycetes
- Order: Lecanorales
- Family: Parmeliaceae
- Genus: Nesolechia; A.Massal. (1856)

Type species
- Nesolechia oxyspora (Tul.) A.Massal. (1856)

Species
- N. doerfeltii N. falcispora N. oxyspora

= Nesolechia (fungus) =

Genus of fungi

Nesolechia is a genus of parasitic fungi in the family Parmeliaceae. All three species in the genus grow on lichens. Nesolechia probably evolved from a lichen ancestor, as it is closely related to many lichenized species of fungi.

Nesolechia fungi typically develop gall-like structures on their hosts that may be roughly spherical to lobe-like or leafy.

== Taxonomy ==
The genus was circumscribed in 1856 by Italian lichenologist Abramo Bartolommeo Massalongo, with Nesolechia oxyspora assigned as the type species. It contained species formerly placed in Abrothallus that produced ascospores without a septum. He also included N. inquinans, N. thallicola, N. heeri, and N. punctum in the genus; these are now placed in the genera Micarea, Phacopsis, Scutula, and Bachmanniomyces, respectively. In his 1930 work on parasitic fungi, Karl von Keissler included 10 species in Nesolechia.

In 2017, Divakar and colleagues used a then-recently developed "temporal phylogenetic" approach to identify temporal bands for specific taxonomic ranks in the family Parmeliaceae, suggesting that groups of species that diverged within the time window of 29.45–32.55 million years ago represent genera. They proposed to synonymize genus Nesolechia with Punctelia (its lichen-forming sister group), because Nesolechia originated relatively recently and fell under the timeframe threshold for genus level. This proposed synonymy was not accepted in a later critical analysis of the temporal phylogenetic approach for fungal classification.

== Species ==
As of July 2021, Species Fungorum accepts three species in Nesolechia:

- Nesolechia doerfeltii (Alstrup & P.Scholz) Diederich (2018)
- Nesolechia falcispora (Triebel & Rambold) Diederich (2018)
- Nesolechia oxyspora (Tul.) A.Massal. (1856)

Index Fungorum lists 62 taxa that have been named Nesolechia, but as Paul Diederich and colleagues explained in their 2018 review of lichenicolous fungi, "A high morphological plasticity, sometimes correlated with host selection, has led to the description of many poorly characterized taxa", and many of those published names are not accepted by taxonomic authorities, or have been transferred to other genera. The following are taxa previously placed in Nesolechia but now accepted in other genera:

- Nesolechia aggregantula (Müll.Arg.) Rehm (1890) = Carbonea aggregantula
- Nesolechia associata (Th.Fr.) Sacc. & D.Sacc. (1906) = Geltingia associata
- Nesolechia cetrariicola (Linds.) Arnold (1874) = Bachmanniomyces punctum
- Nesolechia cladoniaria (Nyl.) Zopf (1896) = Bachmanniomyces punctum
- Nesolechia ericetorum Flot. ex Körb. (1865) = Rhymbocarpus ericetorum
- Nesolechia fusca (Triebel & Rambold) Pérez-Ort. (2010) = Punctelia oxyspora
- Nesolechia heeri (Hepp ex A.Massal.) A.Massal. (1856) = Scutula heeri
- Nesolechia inquinans (Tul.) A.Massal. (1856) = Micarea inquinans
- Nesolechia insita (Stirt.) Vouaux = Steinia geophana
- Nesolechia intumescens (Flörke ex Flot.) Sacc. & D.Sacc. (1906) = Lambiella insularis
- Nesolechia leptostigma (Nyl.) Sacc. & D.Sacc. (1906) = Geltingia associata
- Nesolechia lesdainii Vouaux (1910) = Unguiculariopsis lesdainii
- Nesolechia lichenicola (A.L.Sm. & Ramsb.) Keissl. (1930) = Lecidea lichenicola
- Nesolechia neglecta Vain. (1934) = Rhymbocarpus neglectus
- Nesolechia nitschkei Körb. (1865) = Skyttea nitschkei
- Nesolechia pertusariicola (Jatta) Sacc. & D.Sacc. (1906) = Skyttea heterochroae
- Nesolechia punctum A.Massal. (1856) = Bachmanniomyces punctum
- Nesolechia scabridula (Müll.Arg.) Vouaux (1913) = Llimoniella scabridula
- Nesolechia supersparsa (Nyl.) Rehm (1890) = Carbonea supersparsa
- Nesolechia thallicola (A.Massal.) Rehm (1890) = Phacopsis thallicola
- Nesolechia vermicularis Arnold (1874) = Thamnogalla crombiei
- Nesolechia verrucariae (Nyl.) Rehm (1906) = Toninia verrucariae
- Nesolechia vitellinaria (Nyl.) Rehm (1890) = Carbonea vitellinaria
- Nesolechia xenophana (Körb.) Vouaux (1913) = Cecidonia xenophana
