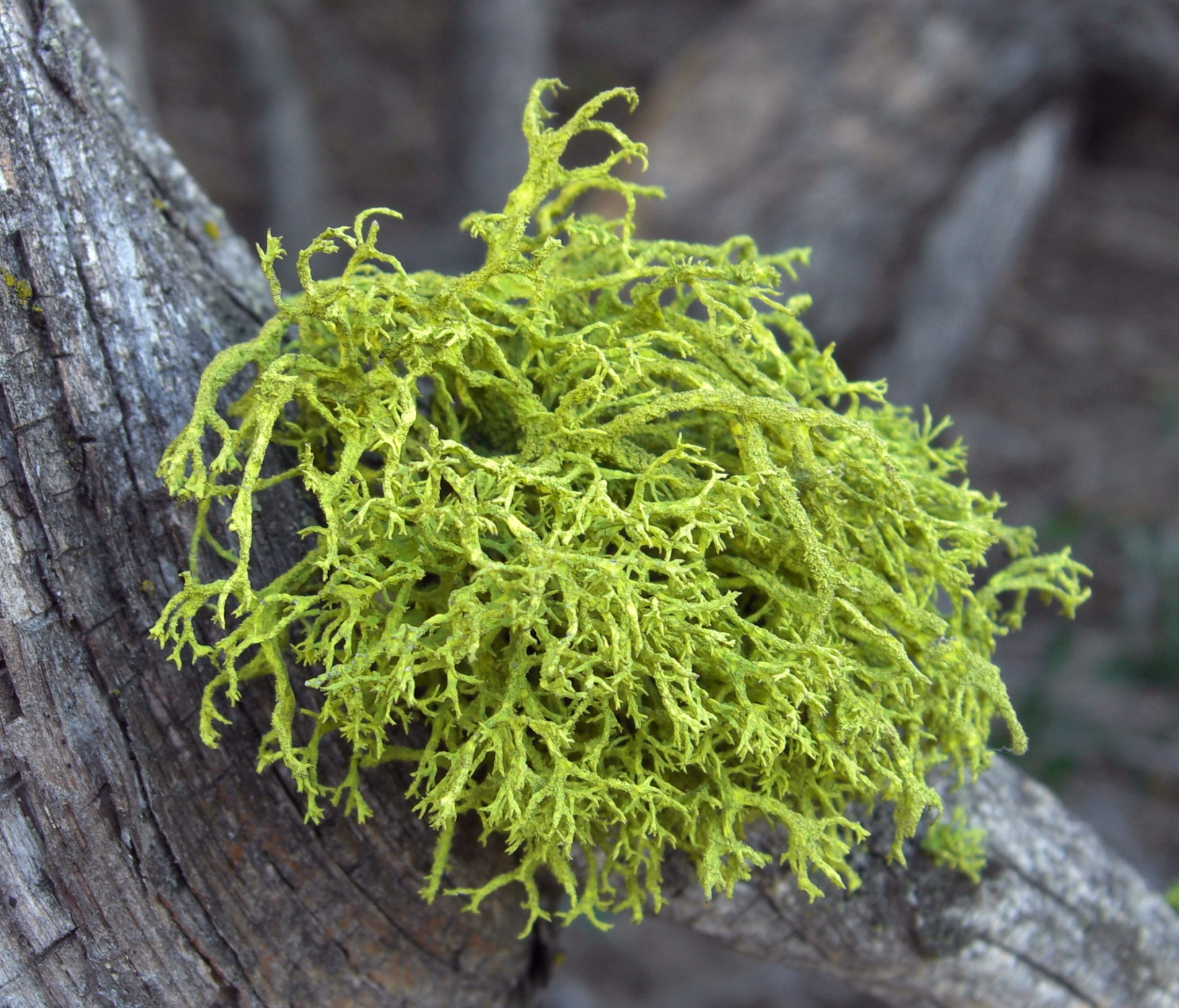
- Photographed in the San Gabriel Mountains, Los Angeles

Conservation status
- Secure (NatureServe)

Scientific classification
- Kingdom: Fungi
- Division: Ascomycota
- Class: Lecanoromycetes
- Order: Lecanorales
- Family: Parmeliaceae
- Genus: Letharia
- Species: L. vulpina

Binomial name
- Letharia vulpina (L.) Hue (1899)

Synonyms
- Lichen vulpinus L. (1753)

= Letharia vulpina =

Species of lichen-forming fungus

Letharia vulpina, commonly known as the wolf lichen (although the species name vulpina, from vulpine relates to the fox), is a fruticose lichenized species of fungus in the family Parmeliaceae. It is bright yellow-green, shrubby and highly branched, and grows on the bark of living and dead conifers in parts of western and continental Europe and the Pacific Northwest and northern Rocky Mountains of North America. This species is somewhat toxic to mammals due to the yellow pigment vulpinic acid, and has been used historically as a poison for wolves and foxes. It has also been used traditionally by many native North American ethnic groups as a pigment source for dyes and paints.

== Taxonomy ==
The lichen was first formally described in 1753 by the Swedish naturalist Carl Linnaeus. He classified it as a member of the eponymous genus Lichen, which was standard practice at the time. Auguste-Marie Hue transferred it to the genus Letharia in 1899.

== Description ==
The thallus, or vegetative body, has a fruticose shape — that is, shrubby and densely branched — and a bright yellow to yellow-green, or chartreuse color, although the color will fade in drier specimens. Its dimensions are typically 2 to 7 cm (0.8 to 3 in) in diameter. The vegetative reproductive structures soredia and isidia are present on the surface of the thalli, often abundantly.

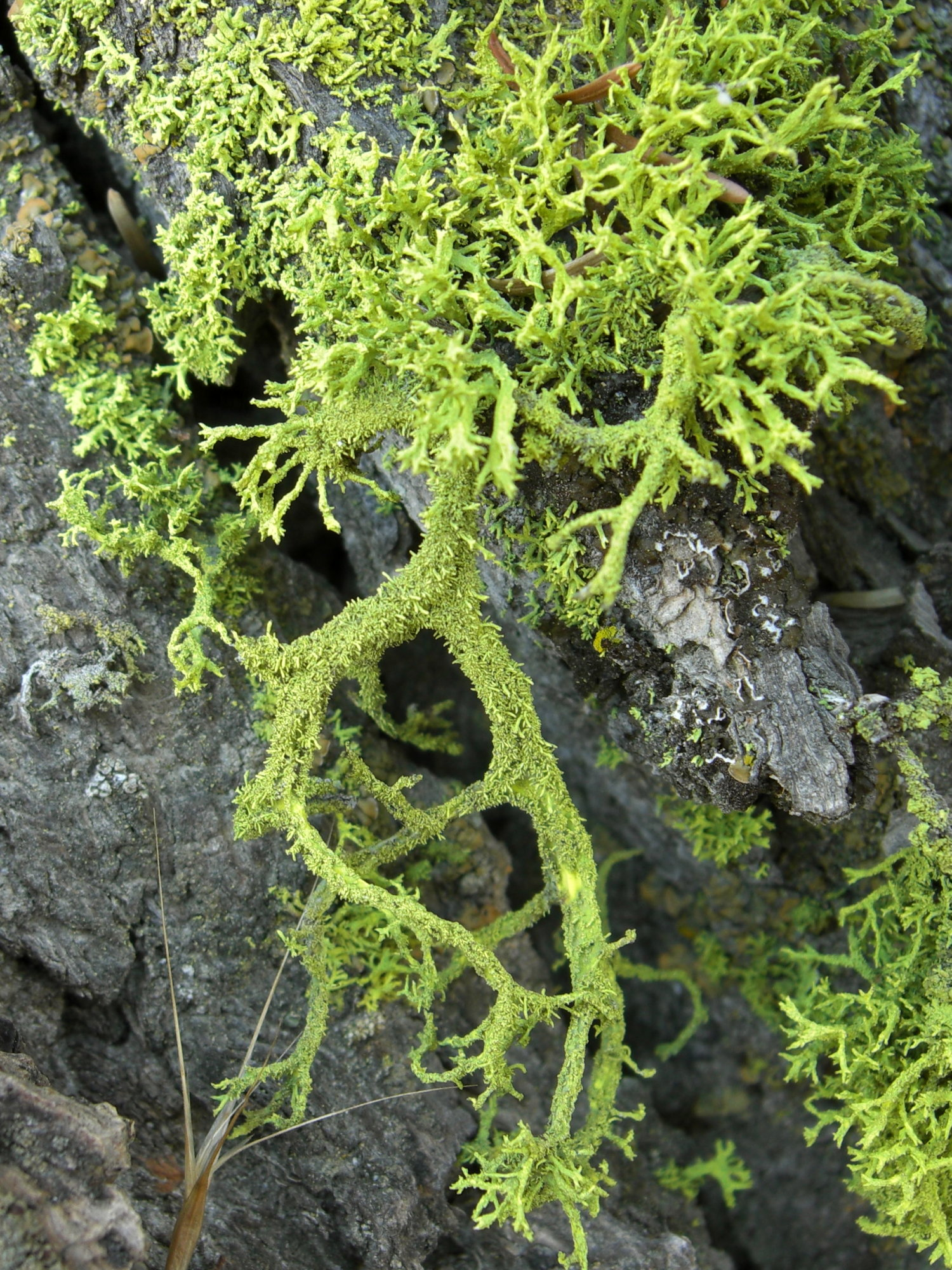
Closeup showing dense covering of vegetative reproductive structures.

== Physiology ==
Like most lichens, L. vulpina is highly tolerant of freezing and low temperatures. In one set of experiments, the lichen was able to reactivate its metabolism after 15 hours of cold storage and resume photosynthesis within 12 minutes of thawing. It was also able to start photosynthesis while rewarming, still at below-zero temperatures (°C), suggesting that it may remain active during winter.

== Distribution and habitat ==
Letharia vulpina occurs throughout the Pacific Northwest. It is often abundant on exposed branches that have lost their bark. In old, moist forests, it is typically found in drier areas. This species has an intermediate air pollution sensitivity. In the Rocky Mountains, Letharia species are found in ponderosa forests at the prairie-forest boundary at relatively low elevations though medium and high elevation Douglas fir and lodgepole pine forests.

== Uses ==
Some Plateau Indian tribes used wolf lichen as a poultice for swelling, bruises, sores, and boils, and boiled it as a drink to stop bleeding.

The brightly coloured fruiting bodies are popular in floral arrangements.

=== Dyeing ===
Wolf moss is traditionally used as the yellow dye in Chilkat blankets woven by the Tlingit people. The dye acts as a natural pesticide for the wool clothing. The wolf moss range doesn't extend to the Tongass forest, indicating that the lichen was traded. The Klamath Indians in California soaked porcupine quills in a chartreuse-colored extract of Letharia vulpina that dyed them yellow; the quills were woven into the basket patterns.

Vulpinic acid, poisonous dye in L. vulpina.

=== Poison ===
The use of this species for poisoning wolves and foxes goes back at least hundreds of years, based on the mention of the practice in Christoph Gedner's "Of the use of curiosity", collected in Benjamin Stillingfleet, Miscellaneous Tracts Relating to Natural History, Husbandry and Physics (London, 1759). According to British lichenologist Annie Lorrain Smith, reindeer carcasses were stuffed with lichen and powdered glass, and suggests that the sharp edges of the glass would make the animals' internal organs more susceptible to the effects of the lichen poison. However, it is known that the lichen itself is also effective—powdered lichen added to fat and inserted into reindeer carcasses will also be fatal to wolves that consume it. The toxic chemical is the yellow dye vulpinic acid, which is poisonous to all meat-eaters, but not to mice and rabbits.

== Similar species ==
The closely related Letharia columbiana lacks isidia and soredia, usually bearing instead apothecia. It is also less branched than L. vulpina.

== See also ==
- List of lichens named by Carl Linnaeus
