= Phacopsis thallicola =

Scientific classification
- Domain: Eukaryota
- Kingdom: Fungi
- Division: Ascomycota
- Class: Lecanoromycetes
- Order: Lecanorales
- Family: Parmeliaceae
- Genus: Phacopsis
- Species: P. thallicola

Binomial name
- Phacopsis thallicola (A.Massal.) Triebel & Rambold (1988)

Synonyms
- Lecidea thallicola A.Massal. (1852); Scutula massalongiana Trevis. (1856); Scutula thallicola (A.Massal.) Anzi (1860); Abrothallus curreyi Linds (1866); Mycoblastus thallicola (A.Massal.) Trevis. (1869); Nesolechia thallicola (A.Massal.) Rehm (1890)

Species of fungus

Phacopsis thallicola is a species of lichenicolous (lichen-dwelling) fungus in the family Parmeliaceae. It was first formally described as a new species in 1852 by Italian botanist Abramo Bartolommeo Massalongo, as Lecidea thallicola. The type specimen, collected from the province of Treviso in Italy, was growing on the foliose lichen Parmelia caperata (now known as Flavoparmelia caperata). Dagmar Triebel and Gerhard Walter Rambold transferred the taxon to the genus Phacopsis in 1988. The known generic hosts of Phacopsis thallicola are all in the Parmeliaceae: Parmotrema, Cetrelia, Flavopunctelia, and Hypotrachyna.

Some historical synonyms of Phacopsis thallicola have resulted from proposed taxonomic transfers from its original genus Lecidea to the genera Scutula, Mycoblastus, and Nesolechia. Abrothallus curreyi, first reported by William Lauder Lindsay from New Zealand in 1866, is a synonym of Phacopsis thallicola.

Characteristics of Phacopsis thallicola include its dark-brown hypothecium (the area of tissue in the apothecium immediately below the subhymenium), and the mostly sessile, marginate apothecia. Its ascospores are typically 8–11 by 5–6.5 μm. Its pycnidia are spherical and measure about 120 μm; they are immersed in the thallus of the host. Pycnospores have a bacilliform shape and dimensions of 7 by 1 μm. The fungus has been recorded from Italy, Java, New Zealand (as Abrothallus curreyi), and the United States.
