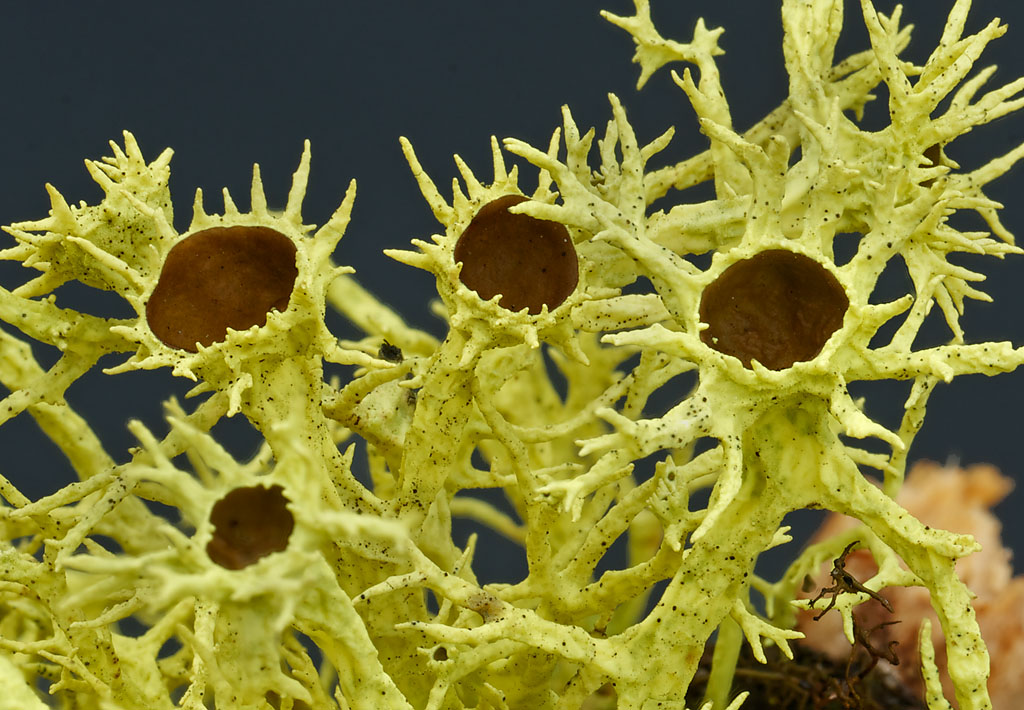

Conservation status
- Apparently Secure (NatureServe)

Scientific classification
- Kingdom: Fungi
- Division: Ascomycota
- Class: Lecanoromycetes
- Order: Lecanorales
- Family: Parmeliaceae
- Genus: Letharia
- Species: L. columbiana

Binomial name
- Letharia columbiana (Nutt.) J.W.Thomson (1969)

Synonyms
- Letharia californica; Borrera columbiana

= Letharia columbiana =

Species of lichen

Letharia columbiana (common name brown-eye wolf lichen) is a common lichen in subalpine forests, particularly in the Pacific Northwest of the United States, and parts of Canada. It is in the family Parmeliaceae, and the genus Letharia. Its characteristics include a bright citron color, “brown-eyes”, and rounded, irregular branches. Though previously believed to lump together several lineages such as Letharia gracilis and others, there now exists more specific characteristics to identify the species. This lichen grows on the bark of conifers a couple inches tall. L. columbiana’s cousin, Letharia vulpina (common name wolf lichen), has similar geographical distribution and morphological features, with the major difference being the “brown-eyes” of L. columbiana.

== Habitat and distribution ==
Letharia columbiana has a healthy distribution in subalpine forests of the United States and Canada, and are common on “high plateaus and ridges to timberline, occasional in low-elevation forests”. The same researcher cataloged the prevalence of this species throughout the Pacific Northwest, though it seemed to avoid the immediate coastline. Another article found them to be "ranging from the southern portion of British Columbia south to California and southwest through northern Idaho and western Montana".

== Taxonomy and similar species ==
This species was first described in 1834 as the only lichen in a paper by Thomas Nuttall.

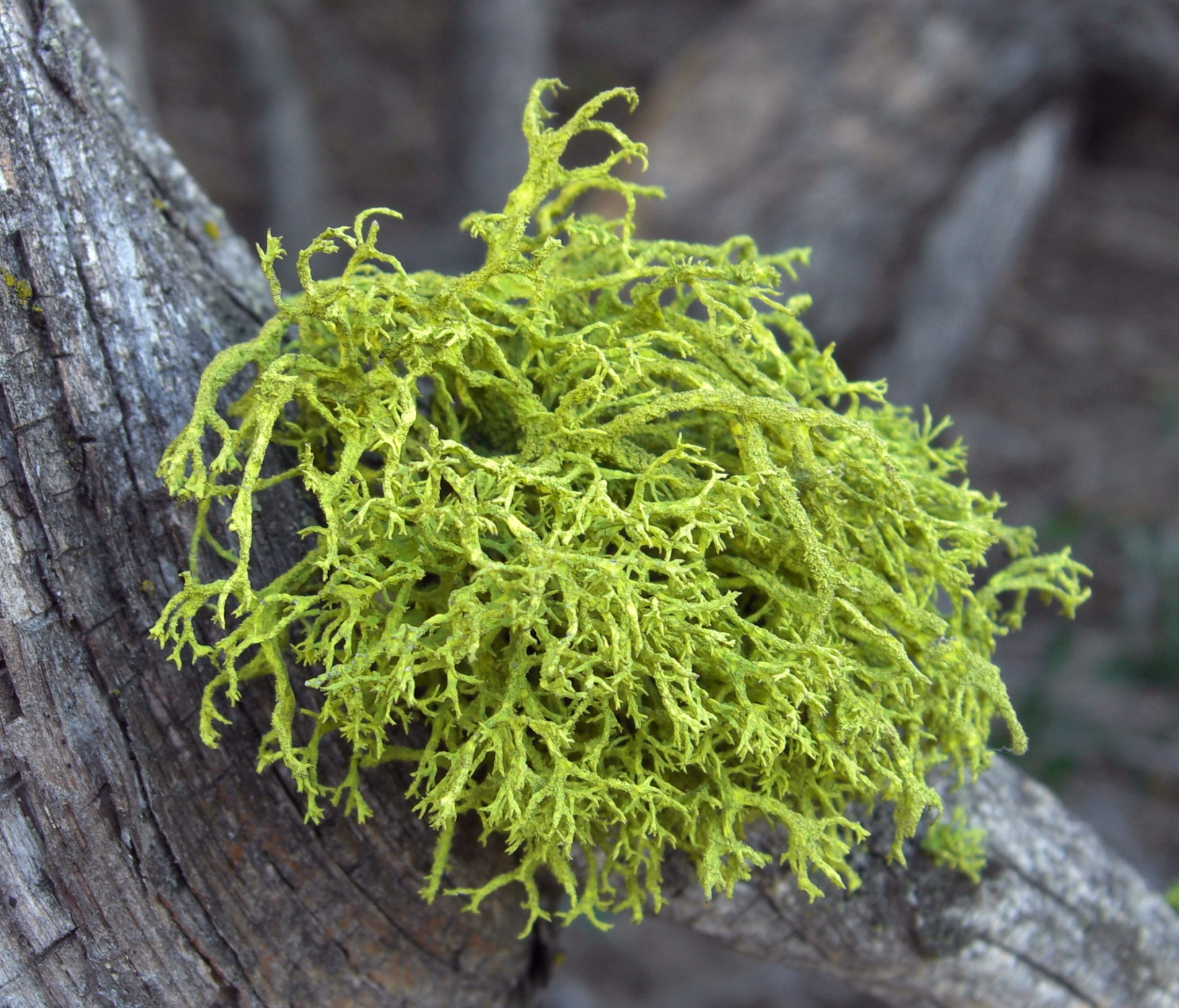
Letharia vulpina

Letharia, a fruticose genus of lichenized Ascomycetes, was historically believed to include only L. vulpina and L. columbiana. However, in 2016 an article published in The Lichenologist used molecular sequencing data to settle taxonomic differences within Letharia. Their results showed independence of four different species that had previously been described under L. columbiana. L. gracilis had already achieved species recognition, and the article described for L. lucida, while advocating for formal recognition of L. barbata and L. rugosa, following additional studies of “diagnostic characters, ecological preference, and distributions”. These species have similar geographical distributions and habitats.

L. columbiana is frequently incorrectly identified as Vulpicida canadensis (common name Brown-eyed Sunshine Lichen, another wolf lichen), due to similar surface coloring and the same brown-eye structures. However, this species has a more flattened, round surface.

== Description ==
Sharing the common characteristics of lichens, this Ascomycete grows 3–11 cm from the bark on which it is attached. The intricate and divaricate ramified thallus produces these irregular branches, 0.5–3 mm wide, with uneven thickness, and a bright yellow-green color. In the midst of these spiky branches are the “brown eyes”, or the fruiting bodies, whose function it is to make spores for reproduction. L. vulpina has no such brown eyes or spores and therefore does not reproduce sexually. This is one way to differentiate the two species.

== Life cycle and reproduction ==
Lichens are a combination of fungus and algae (sometimes cyanobacteria), but only the fungus reproduces sexually with the presence of spores. The new ascospores now need to find a symbiotic relationship with a new algal species. L. columbiana lacks abundant asexual structures, and in turn bears apothecia, a type of Ascocarp. Apothecium is a wide, saucer-like fruiting body containing three parts: a hymenium, hypothecium, and excipulum. The hymenium consisting of asci is the fertile layer of the structure. Different apothecia may employ different dispersal strategies, and therefore the arrangement of asci within them may be different, but there is not sufficient research on the asci of L. columbiana to determine their arrangements.

== Vulpinic acid ==
Vulpinic acid

A common characteristic of Letharia is the presence of vulpinic acid, a secondary metabolite of the symbiosis between fungi and algae. Its biological function is hypothesized to be a repellant against grazing herbivores. L. columbiana was used for its vulpinic acid, by Native Americans and Northern Europeans for poison-tipped arrows. Vulpinic acid is poisonous to all meat-eaters such as humans and carnivorous mammals, but not to rodents.

Some other Natives Americans used the lichen in medicine, balms, or as a source of dyeing water with its recognizable bright-yellow color.

== Ecological impact ==
Observing the ecological implications of lichens allows scientists to study the health of conifer forests. Due to the positive correlation between forest age and lichen biomass, lichen diversity and abundance are highly dependent on preserving habitats and existing L. columbiana populations. Human mediated dispersal is a suggested method of propagation and maintaining the health of the species.
