= Phacopsis lethariellae =

Scientific classification
- Kingdom: Fungi
- Division: Ascomycota
- Class: Lecanoromycetes
- Order: Lecanorales
- Family: Parmeliaceae
- Genus: Phacopsis
- Species: P. lethariellae

Binomial name
- Phacopsis lethariellae Hafellner & Rambold (1995)

Species of fungus

Phacopsis lethariellae is a species of lichenicolous (lichen-dwelling) fungus in the family Parmeliaceae. It was formally described as a new species in 1995 by Josef Hafellner and Gerhard Rambold. The type specimen was collected by the first author from La Fortaleza (La Gomera) at an altitude of 1,180 m (3,870 ft), where it was found growing on the thallus of the lichen Lethariella intricata. It causes formations of galls, which also creates a torsion on the thallus. It has dark brown to black apothecia that are typically 0.3–0.5 mm in diameter, with a convex disc. Its ascospores are ellipsoid to ovoid, measuring 11–13 by 6–7 micrometres. The fungus, known to occur only in the Canary Islands, is named after the genus of its host.
