= Xanthoparmelia annexa =

Scientific classification
- Domain: Eukaryota
- Kingdom: Fungi
- Division: Ascomycota
- Class: Lecanoromycetes
- Order: Lecanorales
- Family: Parmeliaceae
- Genus: Xanthoparmelia
- Species: X. annexa

Binomial name
- Xanthoparmelia annexa (Kurok.) Elix (2003)

Synonyms
- Paraparmelia annexa (Kurok.) Elix & J.Johnst. (1986); Parmelia annexa Kurok. (1964); Pseudoparmelia annexa (Kurok.) Hale (1974)

Species of lichen

Xanthoparmelia annexa is a foliose lichen species in the family Parmeliaceae. It was first formally described as a new species in 1964 by Japan lichenologist Syo Kurokawa. After being transferred to genus Paraparmelia in 1986, John Elix transferred it to the genus Xanthoparmelia in 2003 after the two genera were deemed to be synonymous.

== See also ==
- List of Xanthoparmelia species
