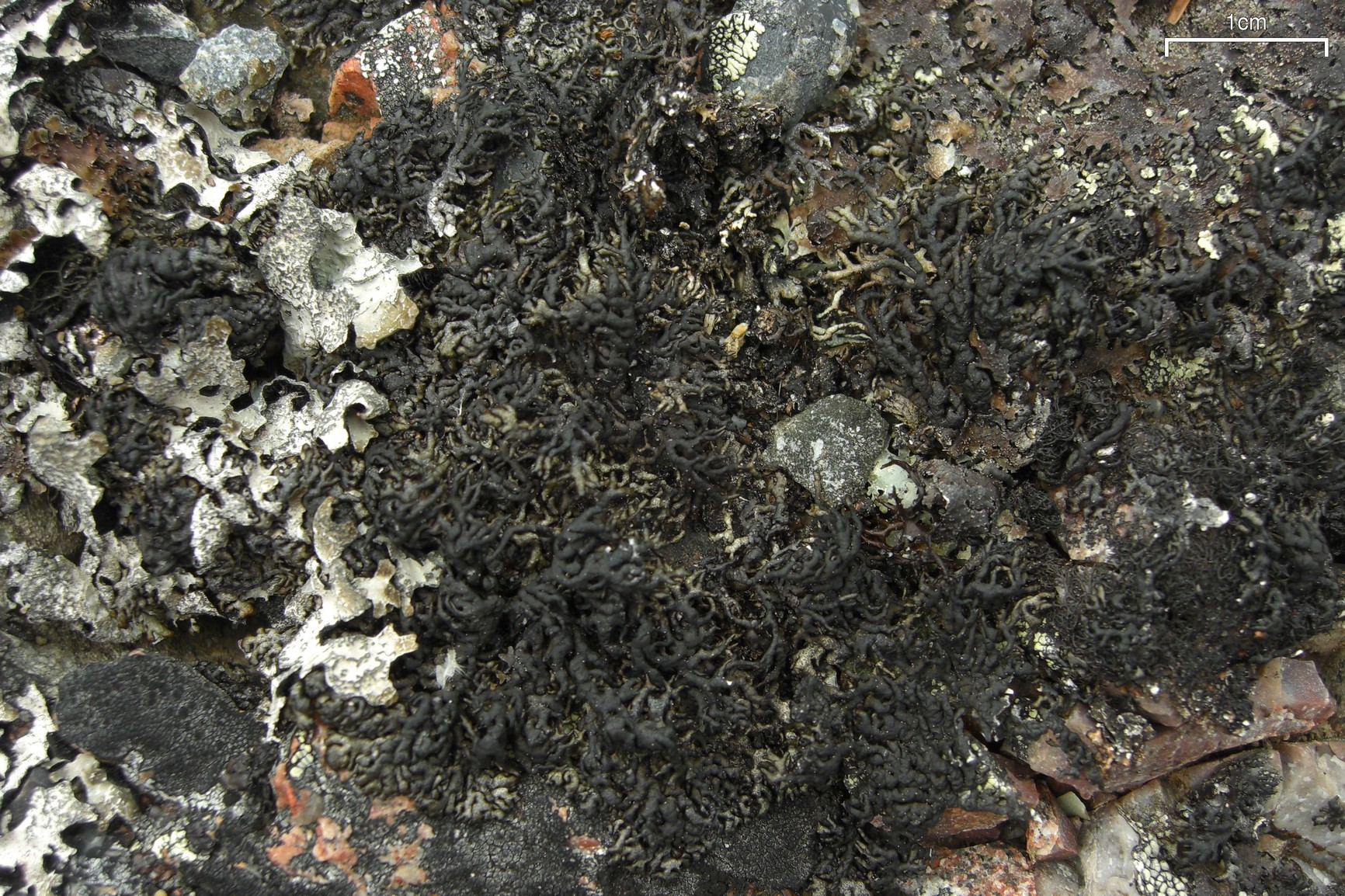

Conservation status
- Secure (NatureServe)

Scientific classification
- Kingdom: Fungi
- Division: Ascomycota
- Class: Lecanoromycetes
- Order: Lecanorales
- Family: Parmeliaceae
- Genus: Allantoparmelia
- Species: A. alpicola

Binomial name
- Allantoparmelia alpicola (Th.Fr.) Essl. (1978)

Synonyms
- List: Parmelia alpicola Th.Fr. (1860); Parmelia encausta var. alpicola (Th.Fr.) Nyl. (1866); Imbricaria alpicola (Th.Fr.) Arnold (1873); Parmelia encausta f. alpicola (Th.Fr.) Tuck. (1882); Parmelia encausta subsp. alpicola (Th.Fr.) Lamy (1884); Hypogymnia alpicola (Th.Fr.) Hav. (1936); Parmelia ceratophylla var. atrofusca Schaer. (1850); Parmelia encausta var. atrofusca (Schaer.) Müll.Arg. (1862); Parmelia atrofusca (Schaer.) Cromb. (1879); Hypogymnia atrofusca (Schaer.) Räsänen (1943); Parmelia intestiniformis var. atrofusca (Schaer.) Hasselrot (1953); Brodoa atrofusca (Schaer.) Goward (1987)

= Allantoparmelia alpicola =

Species of lichen

Allantoparmelia alpicola is a species of saxicolous (rock-dwelling), foliose lichen in the family Parmeliaceae. It has a circumpolar distribution.

== Taxonomy ==
It was described as a new species in 1860 by the Swedish lichenologist Theodor Magnus Fries, who classified it in the genus Parmelia. The species underwent several taxonomic reclassifications over the next century, being transferred between different genera and sometimes treated as a subtaxon of other species, until Theodore Esslinger placed it in Allantoparmelia in 1978.

== Description ==
Allantoparmelia alpicola has a dark brown, foliose (leafy) thallus that is sometimes cushion-like in form, and measures up to 12 cm in diameter, with lobes up to 1.5 mm wide. It contains two secondary metabolites (lichen products): alectorialic acid and barbatolic acid.

== Habitat, distribution, and ecology ==
Allantoparmelia alpicola has a circumpolar distribution. In western North America, its range extends south from the Subarctic to Washington and Montana. It has a broad distribution across Europe, spanning from the Nordic countries (Norway, Sweden, Finland, and Iceland) to Central Europe (Germany, Austria, Switzerland, Czechia, and Slovakia) and extending into Eastern Europe (Poland, Ukraine, Romania, Russia, and Bulgaria). The species is also found in the Mediterranean region (Italy and Macedonia), the British Isles, and Arctic territories including Greenland and Svalbard.

A long-term study in Norway's Jotunheimen National Park revealed that A. alpicola is a very slow-growing lichen compared to other parmelioid species. In a glacier foreland chronosequence spanning 240 years, the largest thallus observed was 83 mm in diameter, indicating an average radial growth rate of only 0.35 mm per year. When analysing the five largest specimens, the average growth rate was even lower at 0.23 mm annually. This extremely slow growth rate, which is among the lowest recorded for parmelioid lichens, is likely due to the short growing season in its alpine habitat. Unlike some other lichens that show varying growth phases, A. alpicola appears to maintain a relatively constant linear growth pattern throughout its development. While the species can be found at lower elevations down to about 500 metres above sea level in southern Norway, it is primarily adapted to and most commonly found in alpine environments.
