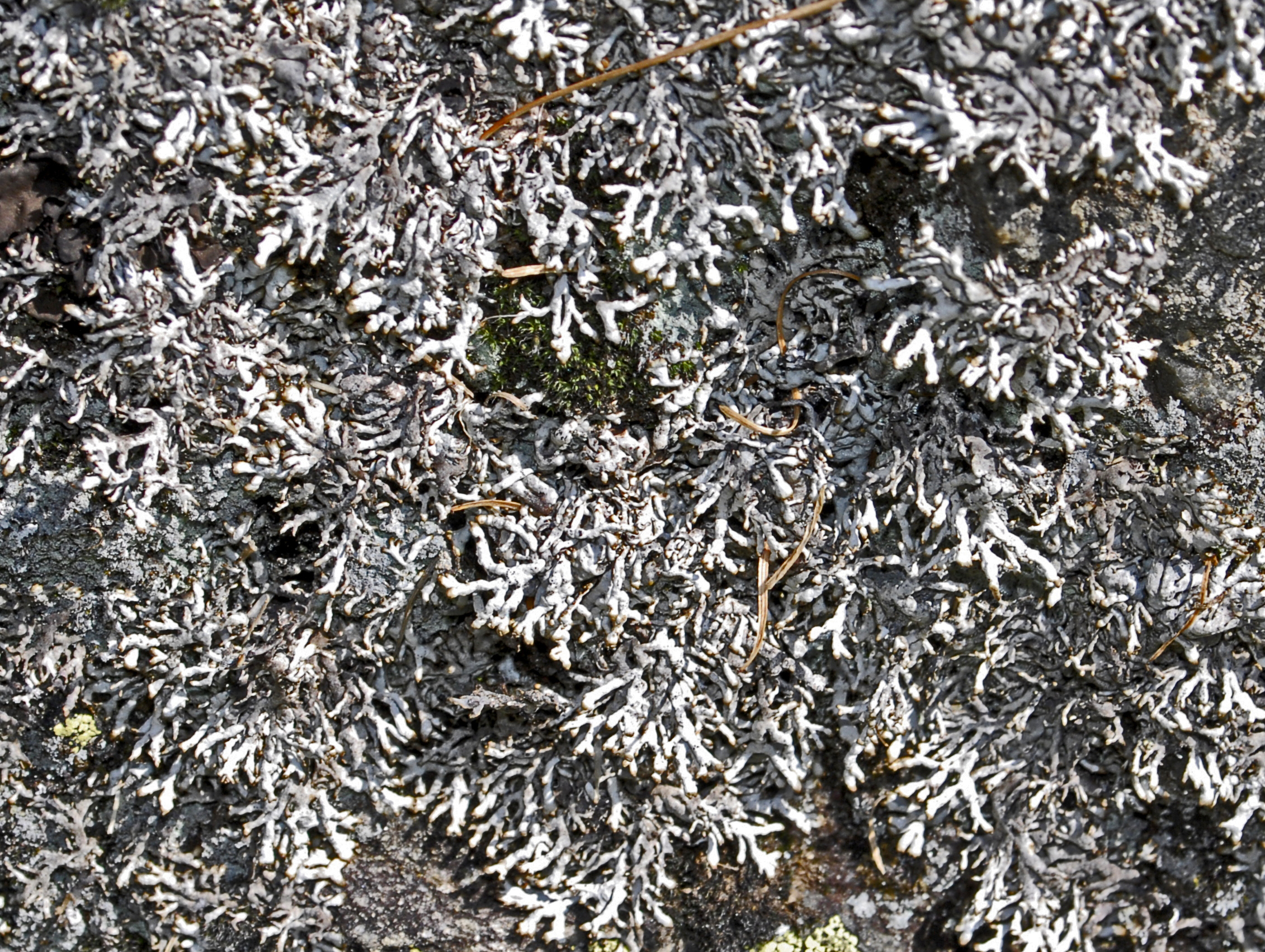

Scientific classification
- Domain: Eukaryota
- Kingdom: Fungi
- Division: Ascomycota
- Class: Lecanoromycetes
- Order: Lecanorales
- Family: Parmeliaceae
- Genus: Brodoa
- Species: B. intestiniformis

Binomial name
- Brodoa intestiniformis (Vill.) Goward

Synonyms
- Hypogymnia encausta (Sm.) Walt. Watson; Hypogymnia intestiniformis (Vill.) Räsänen; Parmelia encausta (Sm.) Nyl.; Parmelia encausta var. multipuncta (Ehrh.) Th. Fr.; Parmelia intestiniformis (Vill.) Ach.

= Brodoa intestiniformis =

Species of fungus

Brodoa intestiniformis is a species of lichenized fungi within the Parmeliaceae family.

This species is present in arctic and northern boreal and alpine regions.
