= Protousnea =

Scientific classification
- Domain: Eukaryota
- Kingdom: Fungi
- Division: Ascomycota
- Class: Lecanoromycetes
- Order: Lecanorales
- Family: Parmeliaceae
- Genus: Protousnea (Motyka) Krog (1976)

Species
- P. fibrillatae P. magellanica

Synonyms
- Usnea subgen. Protousnea Motyka (1936)

Genus of lichens in the family Parmeliaceae

Protousnea is a genus of lichenised ascomycetes in the large family Parmeliaceae. It contains two accepted species. Protousnea species have a fruticose growth form, similar to beard lichens (genus Usnea). The genus is endemic to southern South America. The genus was circumscribed in 1976 by Hildur Krog as a segregate genus from Usnea.

== Species ==
- Protousnea fibrillatae Calvelo, Stock.-Wörg., Liber. & Elix (2003)
- Protousnea magellanica (Mont.) Krog (1976)
