= Scutula =

Scientific classification
- Kingdom: Fungi
- Division: Ascomycota
- Class: Lecanoromycetes
- Order: Lecanorales
- Family: Ramalinaceae
- Genus: Scutula; Tul. (1852)

Type species
- Scutula wallrothii Tul. (1852)

Synonyms
- Hollosia Gyeln. (1939)

Genus of fungi

Scutula is a genus of lichenicolous fungi in the family Ramalinaceae.

== Taxonomy ==
The genus Scutula was circumscribed by French botanist Louis René Étienne Tulasne in 1862. The limits of the generic circumscription as well as the limits of certain species in Scutula was confused for a long time. In 1997, Triebel and colleagues applied the name Scutula specifically to a group of species growing on hosts of the Lecanorales suborder Peltigerineae, a monophyletic grouping of cyanobacteria-associated lichens. Before this, Scutula was applied to a diverse set of unrelated lichenicolous fungi featuring hyaline spores with a single septum and sessile apothecia.

Once classified in the family Micareaceae, molecular phylogenetic analysis showed Scutula to be nested within the Ramalinaceae, closely related to the genus Toninia. This familial placement has been accepted in recent large-scale updates of fungal classifications.

== Description ==
Scutula species are characterized by apothecia that are either lecideine (where exciple forms the underside and outer layer of the apothecium, extending up to the rim, where it forms a darkened "proper margin") or biatorine (having a pale, not darkened proper margin and always lacking a thalline margin). The paraphyses are non-capitate (i.e., lacking a knob-like structure at the tip). Asci have a fuzzy amyloid (in Lugol's iodine solution after pre-treatment with KOH) axial tube structure of the ‘Scutula’-type. The ascospores are smooth, hyaline, and contain a single septum. Anamorphs associated with Scutula include Libertiella in the mesoconidia and Karsteniomyces in the macroconidia.

== Species ==
- Scutula aggregata Bagl. & Carestia (1889)
- Scutula circumspecta (Nyl. ex Vain.) Kistenich, Timdal, Bendiksby & S.Ekman (2018)
- Scutula curvispora (D.Hawksw. & Miadl.) Diederich (2018)
- Scutula dedicata Triebel, Wedin & Rambold (1997)
- Scutula didymospora (D.Hawksw. & Miadl.) Diederich (2018)
- Scutula effusa (Auersw. ex Rabenh.) Kistenich, Timdal, Bendiksby & S.Ekman (2018)
- Scutula epiblastematica (Wallr.) Rehm (1890)
- Scutula heeri (Hepp ex A.Massal.) P. Karst. (1885)
- Scutula krempelhuberi Körb. (1865)
- Scutula miliaris (Wallr.) P.Karst. (1853)
- Scutula nephromatis (Speg.) Etayo (2008)
- Scutula pseudocyphellariae Etayo & Triebel (2010)
- Scutula solorinaria (Nyl.) P.Karst. (1885)
- Scutula stereocaulorum (Anzi) Körb. (1865)
- Scutula tuberculosa (Th.Fr.) Rehm (1906)
- Scutula wallrothii Tul. (1852)
