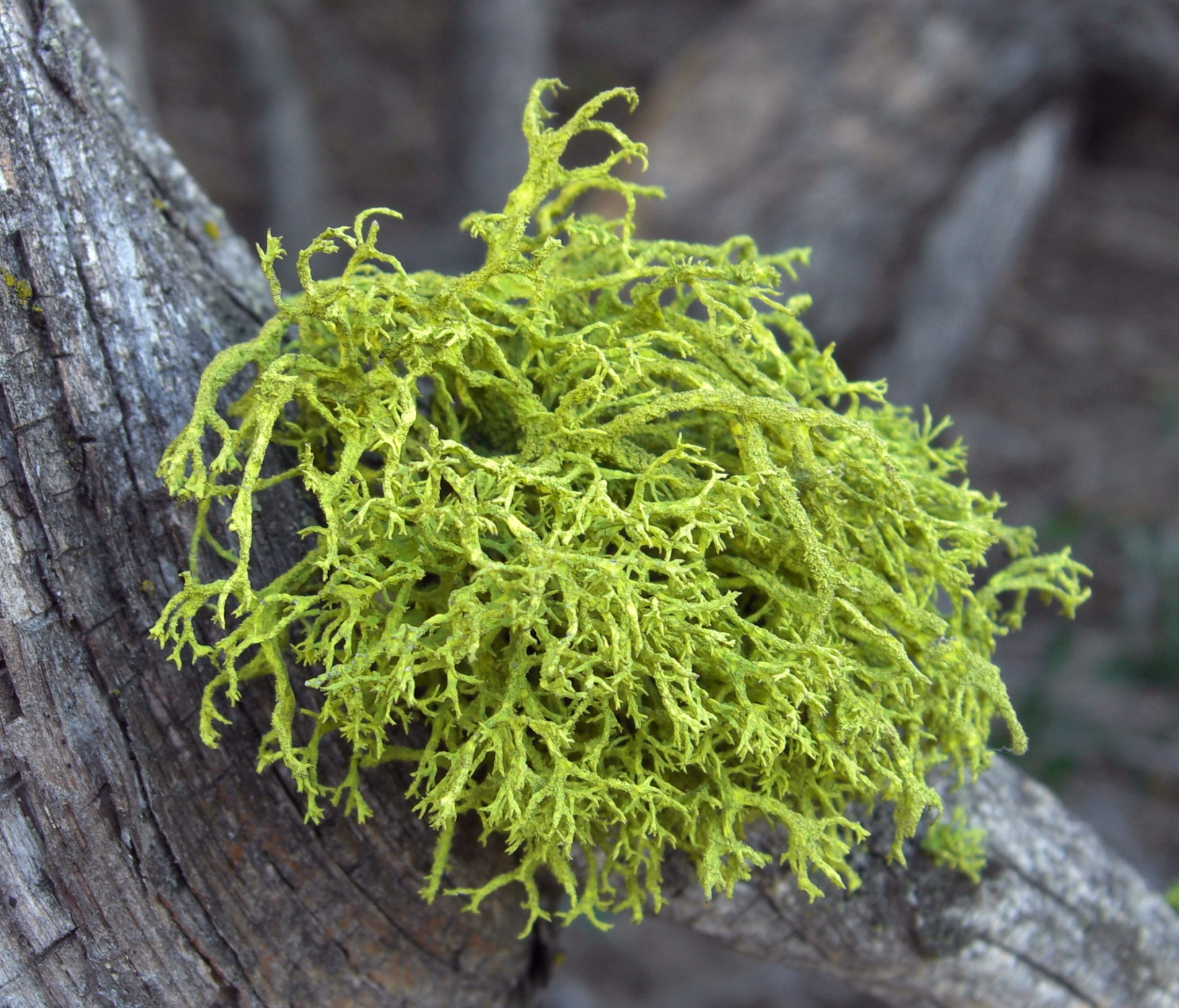
- Letharia vulpina in the San Gabriel Mountains, Los Angeles USA.

Scientific classification
- Kingdom: Fungi
- Division: Ascomycota
- Class: Lecanoromycetes
- Order: Lecanorales
- Family: Parmeliaceae
- Genus: Letharia (Th.Fr.) Zahlbr. (1892)

Type species
- Letharia vulpina (L.) Hue (1899)

Synonyms
- Chlorea Nyl. (1855); Evernia subdiv. Letharia Th.Fr. (1871); Nylanderaria Kuntze (1891); Rhytidocaulon Nyl. ex Elenkin (1916)

= Letharia =

Genus lichen-forming fungi

Letharia is a genus of fruticose lichens belonging to the family Parmeliaceae. Molecular phylogenetics studies have revealed that what were once considered just two species actually represent at least several distinct evolutionary lineages, with western North America serving as the centre of diversity for the group. These lichens typically grow on sun-exposed wood and bark of coniferous trees, growing in dry habitats where they receive moisture from dew or fog.

== Taxonomy ==
Historically only two species were recognised in Letharia: L. vulpina and L. columbiana. The traditional distinction between the two species was treated as a classic lichen species pair, with sorediate thalli assigned to L. vulpina and fertile thalli with abundant ascomata assigned to L. columbiana. Altermann and colleagues noted, however, that this separation was imperfect, because some L. columbiana specimens also produce isidia, while typically sorediate L. vulpina can occasionally bear apothecia. A 2016 multi-locus molecular study that sequenced three fungal and two algal markers from 302 thalli retrieved at least six well-supported, reproductively independent lineages—two within the traditional L. vulpina concept and four within L. columbiana sensu lato. One of the former was formally described as Letharia lupina. To stabilise usage of the name L. columbiana, Altermann and colleages designated a freshly sequenced specimen from the Walla Walla River valley (Oregon) as an epitype, because the 1833 holotype is a degraded, mixed gathering dominated by L. vulpina and riddled with contaminants. Three further lineages—L. gracilis, L. barbata and L. rugosa—were judged likely to merit species rank once additional diagnostic data become available. Each fungal species partners exclusively with a distinct photobiont clade inside Trebouxia jamesii sensu lato, showing that Letharia represents several discrete symbioses rather than a single variable species complex. An earlier multilocus study based on 432 specimens broadly recovered the same six candidate lineages proposed in earlier molecular work, but found that the strongest and most consistent separation was between the sorediate groups later treated as L. lupina and L. vulpina, while relationships among the apotheciate lineages remained less certain.

The same work shows that western North America is the centre of diversity for the group: L. lupina alone accounted for 88% of nearly 300 North American collections and ranges from valley bottoms to the alpine tree line, extending east of the Continental Divide into Alberta and the northern Rocky Mountains. By contrast, L. vulpina is largely confined to lower, drier conifer forests and is much rarer on the continent, though it remains the prevalent Letharia in Europe. Traditional morphological characters such as branch density, branch colour and isidial abundance were found to vary widely within species, rendering them unreliable for routine identification; instead, fixed nucleotide differences in the DNA sequence, or PCR-RFLP assays, allow rapid discrimination between L. vulpina and L. lupina.

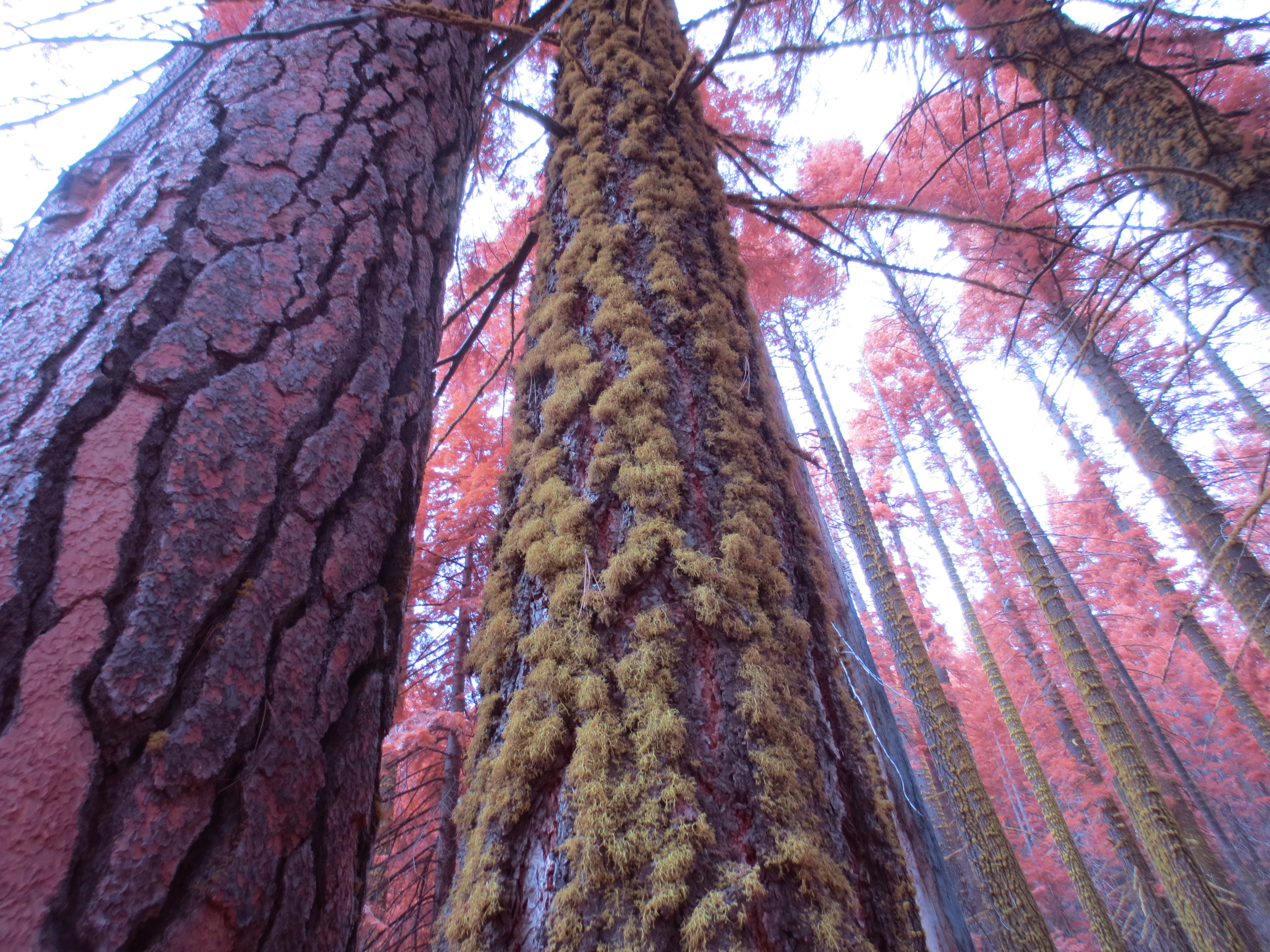
Here, Letharia vulpina is visualized using an infrared spectrometry. The chlorophyll in the fir needles reflects near infrared wavelengths of light, but the green vulpinic acid of the wolf lichen does not.

== Habitat and distribution ==
Letharia lupina occurs across a broad spectrum of habitats and elevations, extending from valley woodlands at about 190 m to alpine tree line near 3370 m. It is most frequently encountered on sun-bleached, decorticated conifer timber—old fence posts, fallen trunks and branches of Pinus in particular—and also spreads to the bark of Abies, Picea, Calocedrus and Pseudotsuga. Less commonly it colonises weather-worn hardwoods such as Arbutus, Populus and Salix, or even granitic outcrops.

By contrast, L. vulpina is confined mainly to drier low-elevation conifer forests and chaparral, seldom occurring above roughly 800 m in the north or 1600 m in the south of its range. It shares a preference for lignified (woody) substrates—fence rails and the wood or bark of Pseudotsuga menziesii, Pinus ponderosa and related conifers are typical—but is otherwise less particular in its choice of hosts. Field observations suggest that both species prosper in sunny, summer-dry habitats where nightly dew or fog provides brief moisture pulses needed for photosynthesis.

Outside western North America, the genus also occurs in continental Europe, northern Africa, Cyprus and the Caucasus, although it is much less common in the Old World and has been reported as declining in northern Europe.

== Species ==
- Letharia columbiana (Nutt.) J.W.Thomson (1969)
- Letharia gracilis Kroken ex McCune & Altermann (2009)
- Letharia lupina Altermann, S.D.Leav. & Goward (2016)
- Letharia pirionii B.de Lesd. (1935)
- Letharia subdivaricata Frey & Oxner (1926)
- Letharia vulpina (L.) Hue (1899)
