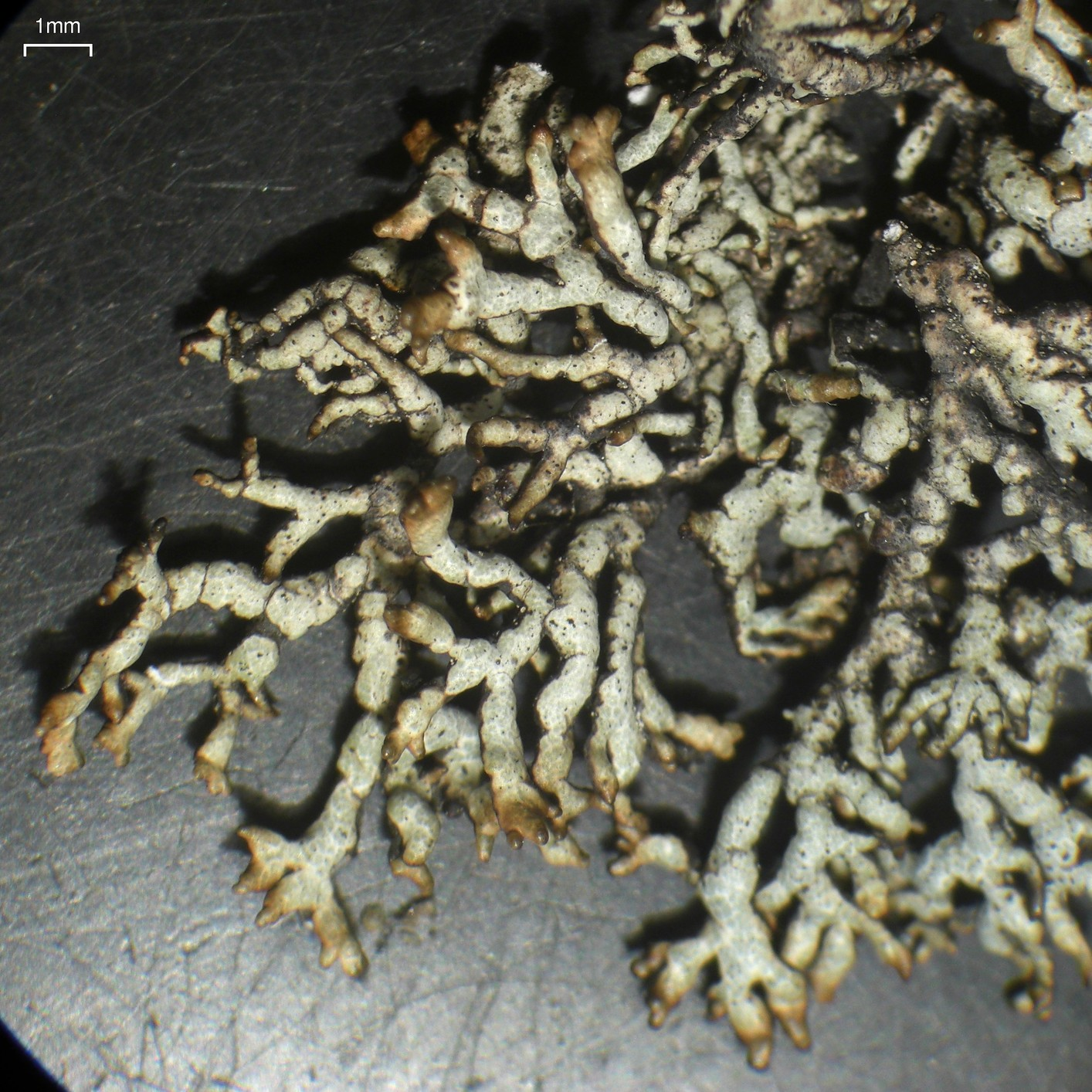
- Brodoa oroarctica

Scientific classification
- Domain: Eukaryota
- Kingdom: Fungi
- Division: Ascomycota
- Class: Lecanoromycetes
- Order: Lecanorales
- Family: Parmeliaceae
- Genus: Brodoa; Goward (1987)

Type species
- Brodoa oroarctica (Krog) Goward (1987)

Species
- B. atrofusca B. intestiniformis B. oroarctica

= Brodoa =

Genus of fungi

Brodoa is a genus of three species of foliose lichens in the family Parmeliaceae. The genus, circumscribed in 1986 by Trevor Goward, is named in honour of the lichenologist Irwin Brodo.
