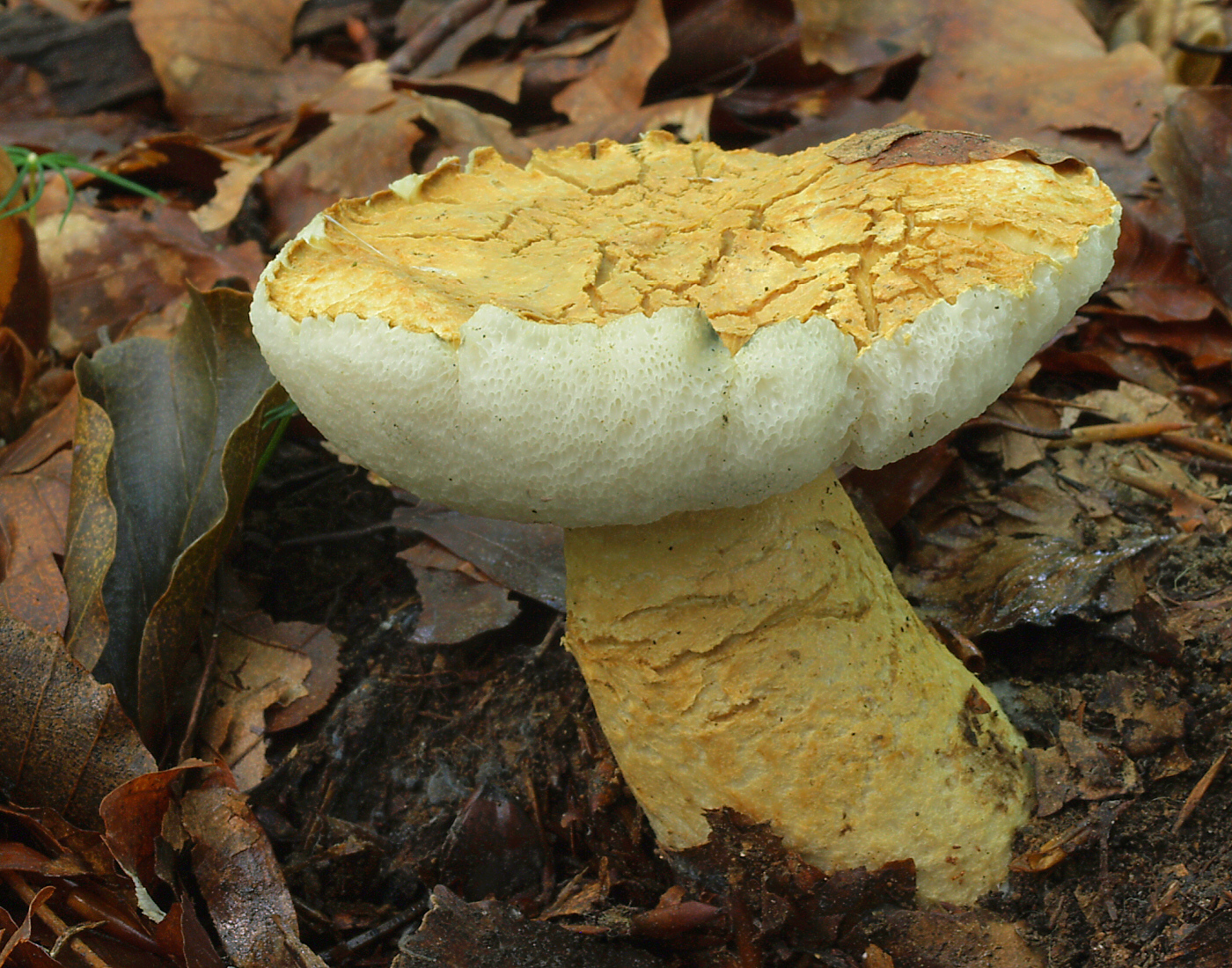

Scientific classification
- Kingdom: Fungi
- Division: Basidiomycota
- Class: Agaricomycetes
- Order: Boletales
- Family: Gyroporaceae
- Genus: Gyroporus
- Species: G. cyanescens

Binomial name
- Gyroporus cyanescens (Bull.) Quél. (1886)

Synonyms
- Boletus cyanescens Bull. (1788); Boletus constrictus Pers. (1801); Leccinum constrictum (Pers.) Gray (1821); Suillus cyanescens (Bull.) P.Karst. (1882); Leucoconius cyanescens (Bull.) Beck (1923)

= Gyroporus cyanescens =

Species of fungus

Gyroporus cyanescens
- Mycological characteristics
- Pores on hymenium
- Cap is convex or flat
- Hymenium attachment is irregular or not applicable
- Stipe is bare
- Spore print is cream to yellow
- Ecology is mycorrhizal
- Edibility is choice

Gyroporus cyanescens, commonly known as the bluing bolete or the cornflower bolete, is a species of bolete fungus in the family Gyroporaceae. First described from France in 1788, the species is found in Eurasia, Australia, and eastern North America, where it grows on the ground in coniferous and mixed forests.

The yellowish to buff cap surface is fibrous and roughened, and reaches up to 12 cm (4.7 in) in diameter. The thick stem, roughly the same color as the cap or lighter, is hollowed out into chambers. All parts of the mushroom turn an intense blue color within a few moments of bruising or cutting. The mushroom is edible, despite its hard stem. A less common variety occurs where the color change is to deep violet rather than blue. The bluing reaction results from the enzymatic oxidation of a chemical called gyrocyanin.

== Taxonomy ==
The species was first described scientifically by French botanist Jean Baptiste François Pierre Bulliard in his 1788 Herbier de la France. Later synonyms include Boletus constrictus by Christian Hendrik Persoon in 1801, Leccinum constrictum by Samuel Frederick Gray in 1821, Suillus cyanescens by Petter Karsten in 1882, and Leucoconius cyanescens by Günther Beck von Mannagetta und Lerchenau in 1923. The variety violaceotinctus was described by Roy Watling in 1969 from collections made in Michigan, USA.

The specific epithet is derived from the Ancient Greek κύανoς, meaning "dark blue", while the varietal epithet violaceotinctus means "having a violet tinge". It is commonly known as the bluing bolete or the cornflower bolete.

== Description ==
The cap of G. cyanescens is initially convex, but flattens out in maturity, sometimes becoming shallowly depressed; it reaches a diameter of 4–12 cm (1 1/2–4 3/4 in). The cap is dry, and ranges in color from buff to yellowish to pale olive, occasionally with darker streaks of color. Its surface is uneven, sometimes with wrinkles and pits. The cap margin is initially curved inward, and sometimes splits in maturity. The flesh is whitish to pale yellow, and has a brittle texture. On the underside of the cap, the pore surface is white to yellowish, sometimes with olive or tan tinges. There are roughly two circular pores per millimeter, and the tubes that comprise the pores are 5–10 mm (1/4–3/8 in) deep, but depressed around the top of the stem. Injury to the pores will cause them to stain first greenish yellow, then greenish blue or blue.

The stem is 4–12 cm (1 1/2–4 3/4 in) long by 1–2.5 cm (1/2–1 in) thick, and is either roughly equal in width throughout its length, or has a basal or middle swelling. The stem tissue is hard and brittle; it is initially stuffed with a soft pith that develops cavities, or becomes entirely hollow in maturity. Roughly the same color as the cap or lighter, the stem surface is dry and lacks reticulations. It is initially covered in coarse hairs that tend to disappear in maturity to leave a relatively smooth surface. All parts of the fruit body stain blue when cut or injured. The variety G. cyanescens var. violaceotinctus is nearly identical in appearance, but stains dark lilac to indigo when bruised. The odor and taste of the fruit bodies is indistinct.

The color of the spore print is pale yellow. The spores are ellipsoid, smooth, hyaline (translucent), and have dimensions of 8–10 by 5–6 μm. The basidia (spore-bearing cells) are club shaped, two- to four-spored, and measure 24–30 by 8–10 μm. Pleurocystidia (cystidia on the inner walls of the tubes) are light yellow brown in color, club shaped, infrequent, and measure 25–38 by 5.5-7.2 μm; the cheilocystidia (found on the tube edge) are colorless, numerous, and measure 32–47 by 7–10 μm. Clamp connections are present in the hyphae.

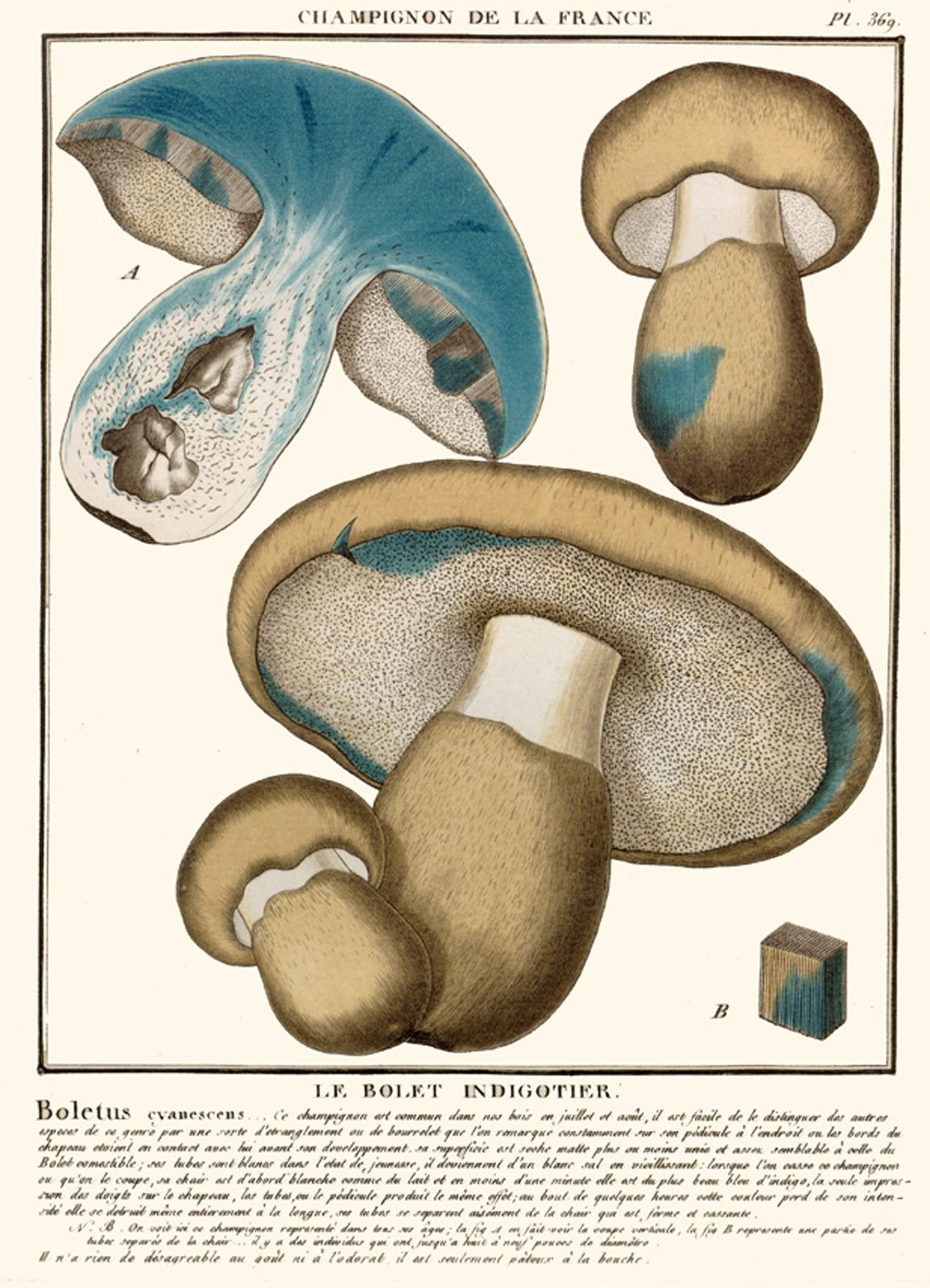
Illustration from Bulliard's original description

=== Chemistry ===
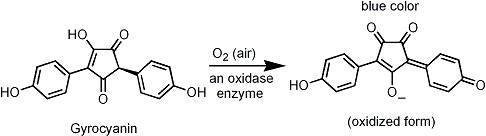
The bluing reaction is caused by oxidation of gyrocyanin.

The identity of the chemical causing bluing upon tissue injury was reported in 1973. The molecule, gyrocyanin, is a highly oxidized bis-aryl-substituted hydroxy-cyclopentenone that develops a blue color when oxidized. In contrast, the bluing of other boletes has been attributed to the oxidation of variegatic or xerocomic acid. Gyrocyanin is biosynthesized from intermediates supplied by the shikimate pathway, a metabolic route used by fungi for the synthesis of aromatic amino acids.

=== Similar species ===
Although there are a few lookalike species with similar overall appearance, in the field, Gyroporus cyanescens is typically readily recognized by its characteristic straw-yellow color and nearly instantaneous dark blue bruising. G. phaeocyanescens is smaller, with a dull brownish-yellow cap. Although its flesh has a bluing reaction to injury, its yellow pore surface does not. It has larger spores, measuring 9–15 by 5–7 μm. G. umbrinosquamosus, found along the Gulf Coast of the United States, is similar in appearance, but lacks the bluing reaction. Newly described from China in 2003, G. brunneofloccosus closely resembles G. cyanescens, and was frequently confused with that species. It has a smaller fruit body, with a brownish cap up to 8 cm (3 in) in diameter. Its staining reaction involves a change from light turquoise to dark turquoise or dark blue. Its spores are 5–8.5 by 4–5.3 μm. Suillus tomentosus has brownish pores that undergo a slower blue staining reaction. If the fruit bodies are not uprooted and only the top of the cap is examined, G. cyanescens can be confused with young Russula fellea mushrooms.

Caloboletus marshii stains light blue but not at the base of the stem.

== Ecology and distribution ==
Gyroporus cyanescens is an ectomycorrhizal species that has a broad host range. Fruit bodies of G. cyanescens grow singly or scattered on the ground in deciduous and mixed forests. Often found in association with birch and poplar, the fungus tends to prefer sandy soil, and also frequents road banks and woodland edges. Fruiting occurs in summer and early autumn. Fruit bodies can be parasitized by the mold Sepedonium ampullosporum. Infection results in necrosis of the mushroom tissue, and a yellow color caused by the formation of large amounts of pigmented aleurioconidia (single-celled conidia produced by extrusion from the conidiophores).

Gyroporus cyanescens is found in Europe, Asia, Australia, and North America (July–September). In China, it is known from Guangdong and Yunnan. The fungus appears in eucalypt woodland in Australia. In North America, it is widespread east of the Rocky Mountains. The geographical distribution ranges from eastern Canada to Florida, and west to Minnesota, although it has been occasionally reported from the Pacific Northwest, and one collection has been made in the Sky Islands of southern Arizona. G. cyanescens var. violaceotinctus has been reported from Japan.

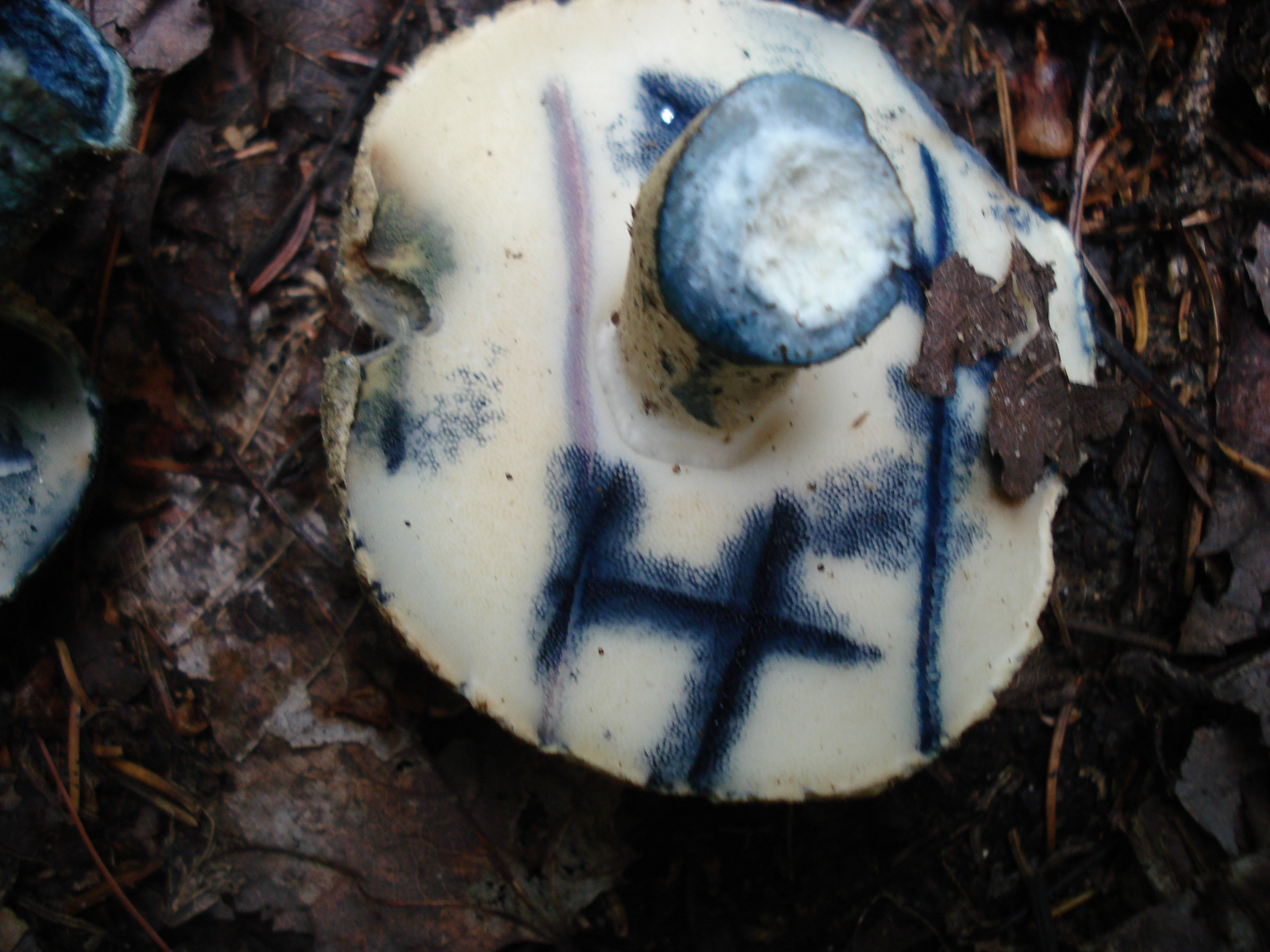
When bruised, the variety violaceotinctus stains dark lilac (seen in left vertical line) that quickly changes to blue.

== Uses ==
Gyroporus cyanescens is edible, and considered "choice" by several sources. The fruit bodies, even if mature, are typically free of insect larvae. Specimens collected in sandy soil, however, are difficult to clean, but cleaning may be facilitated by washing the fruit bodies in a bowl of water so that the sand sinks to the bottom. The blue color largely disappears after two minutes of sautéing. Cooked mushrooms have a meaty texture, and mild nutty flavor that is enhanced if fried to crispness. Drying the mushrooms strengthens the taste.

The variety violaceotinctus is used in mushroom dyeing, and produces a light yellow, beige, gold, or brownish-orange color depending on the mordant used.

== See also ==
- List of North American boletes
