= Phauloppia banksi =

Scientific classification
- Kingdom: Animalia
- Phylum: Arthropoda
- Subphylum: Chelicerata
- Class: Arachnida
- Order: Oribatida
- Family: Oribatulidae
- Genus: Phauloppia
- Species: P. banksi

Binomial name
- Phauloppia banksi Marshall, Reeves & Norton, 1987

Species of mite

Phauloppia banksi is a species of mite in the family Oribatulidae. Found in the United States, it was described as new to science in 1987. A study conducted in New York that showed that the mite is one of several that takes shelter in the thallus of the common North American lichen Punctelia rudecta.
