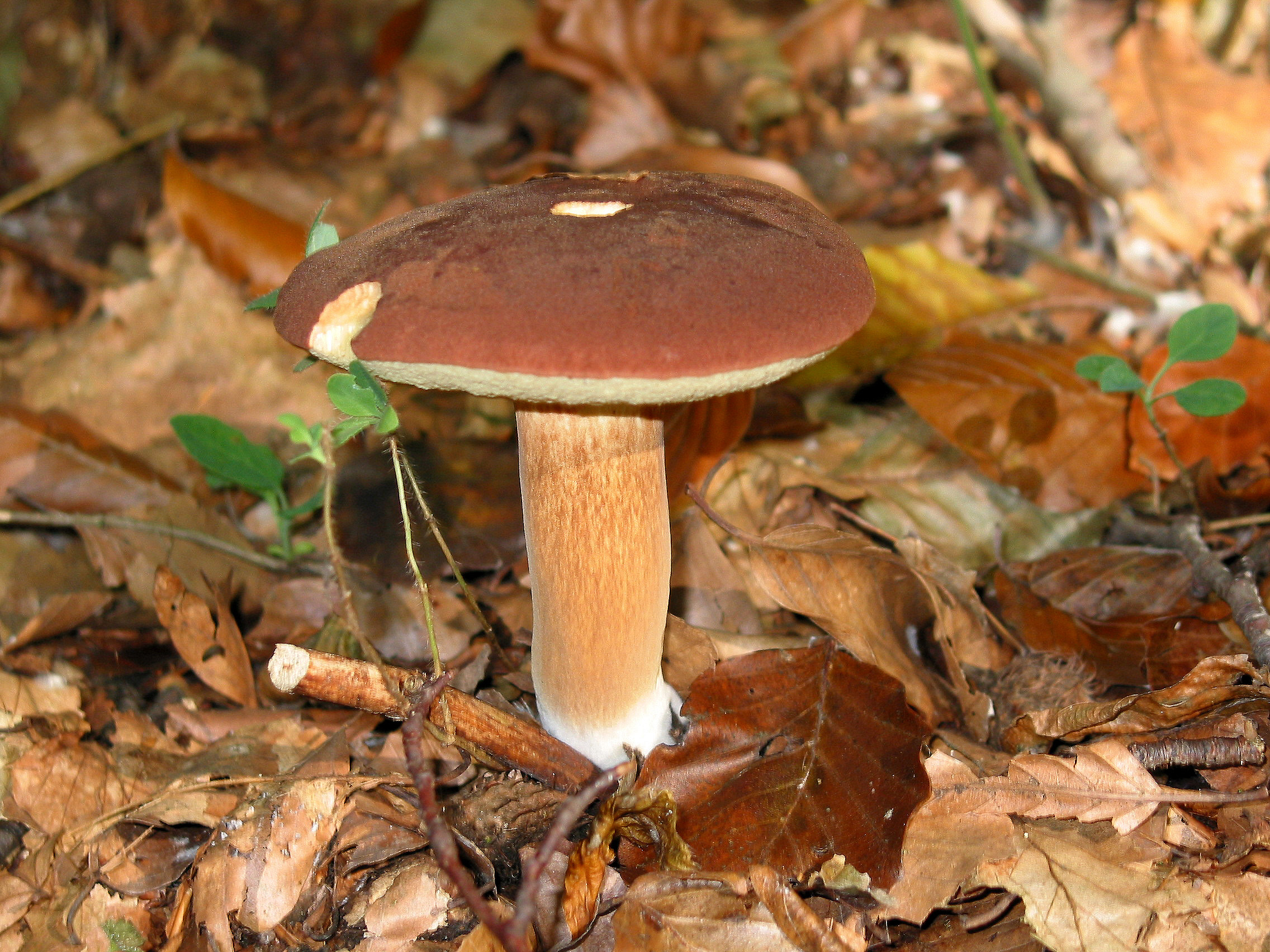
- I. badia under beech and oak

Conservation status
- Least Concern (IUCN 3.1)

Scientific classification
- Kingdom: Fungi
- Division: Basidiomycota
- Class: Agaricomycetes
- Order: Boletales
- Family: Boletaceae
- Genus: Imleria
- Species: I. badia

Binomial name
- Imleria badia (Fr.) Vizzini (2014)

Synonyms
- Boletus castaneus ß badius Fr. (1818); Boletus castaneus var. badius (Fr.) Fr. (1828); Boletus badius (Fr.) Fr. (1832); Rostkovites badia (Fr.) P.Karst. (1881); Viscipellis badia (Fr.) Quél. (1886); Ixocomus badius (Fr.) Quél. (1888); Suillus badius (Fr.) Kuntze (1898); Xerocomus badius (Fr.) E.-J.Gilbert (1931)

= Imleria badia =

Species of fungus found in Europe and North America

Imleria badia
- Mycological characteristics
- Pores on hymenium
- Cap is convex
- Hymenium is adnate
- Stipe is bare
- Spore print is olive to olive-brown
- Ecology is mycorrhizal
- Edibility is choice

Imleria badia, commonly known as the bay bolete, is a species of pored mushroom. First described scientifically by Elias Fries in 1818, the bay bolete was reclassified as Xerocomus badius in 1931, and it is still listed thus in several sources. Modern molecular phylogenetic studies show Xerocomus to be polyphyletic (not descended from the same common ancestor), and the bay bolete is not particularly closely related to species in that genus.

Both the common and scientific names refer to the bay- or chestnut-coloured cap, which is almost spherical in young specimens before broadening and flattening out to a diameter up to 15 cm (6 in). On the cap underside are small yellowish pores that turn dull blue-grey when bruised. The smooth, cylindrical stipe, measuring 4–9 cm (1 1/2–3 1/2 in) long by 1–2 cm (1/2–3/4 in) thick, is coloured like the cap, but paler. The species is found in Eurasia and North America, growing in coniferous or mixed woods on the ground or on decaying tree stumps, sometimes in prolific numbers. Some varieties have also been described from eastern North America, differing from the main type in both macroscopic and microscopic morphology.

Often considered a poor relation of the cep (Boletus edulis), I. badia is nevertheless regarded as a choice edible mushroom by some authors, such as food expert Antonio Carluccio, and is sold in markets in Europe and central Mexico. Its mushrooms are less often infested by maggots than other boletes. Several European studies have demonstrated that the mushroom can bioaccumulate some trace metals from the soil, such as mercury, cobalt, and nickel. Additionally, the mushroom contains a pigment that concentrates radioactive caesium; specimens collected in Europe following the 1986 Chernobyl disaster contained several times more caesium-137 than those collected before the incident.

== Taxonomy ==
The bay bolete was first named as Boletus castaneus ß badius (i.e. a subspecies of Boletus castaneus) by Elias Magnus Fries in 1818. (Note: Though he wrote, "forte distincta species; sed ex unico a me viso specimine distinguere potui, neque debui" (Perhaps a distinct species, but I could not state it definitely from the only specimen I have seen, nor should I.)) Fries later renamed it as a variety of Boletus castaneus in 1828, before assigning it distinct species status in his 1832 work Elenchus Fungorum. The fungus has been transferred to several genera in its taxonomic history: Rostkovites by Petter Karsten in 1881; Viscipellis and Ixocomus by Lucien Quélet in 1886 and 1888, respectively; and Suillus by Otto Kuntze in 1898. In 1931, Edouard-Jean Gilbert reclassified it in the genus Xerocomus, and many sources still list it thus. Review of Xerocomus strongly suggested it was polyphyletic, and the genus was not accepted by some mycologists. The stickiness of its wet cap distinguishes the species from others classified in Xerocomus, and hence it was left in Boletus until Alfredo Vizzini placed it in its own genus in 2014. Genetic analysis published in 2013 shows that Imleria badia is related to B. pallidus and B. glabellus; the three species form a clade known informally as the badius clade within a larger group (informally called anaxoboletus) in the suborder Boletineae. Other clades within the group include the Tylopilus, porcini (= Boletus sensu stricto) and Strobilomyces clades, as well as two other groups composed of members of various genera including Xerocomus (the taxa designated as Xerocomus species in this clade are not Xerocomus species and require new taxonomic designations) and Xerocomellus.

The species Boletus limatulus, originally published by Charles Christopher Frost in 1874, was later redescribed, "with a slight tinge of irritation at the time, energy and gasoline spent", as a variety of I. badia by Wally Snell in 1945 (as Xerocomus badius var. limatulus). The taxon name comes from the Latin limatulus, "rather polished" or "refined". Varieties glaber and macrostipitatus were described from Nova Scotia, Canada, in 1976.

The starting date of fungal taxonomy had been set as January 1, 1821, to coincide with the date of the works of Swedish naturalist Elias Magnus Fries, the "father of mycology". Rolf Singer argued that setting the starting date earlier to Christiaan Persoon's 1801 publication of Synopsis would make a name change necessary, as he had originally given what is now known as Royoporus badius the combination Boletus badius Pers. and if the bay bolete was classified in the genus Boletus, the name would be unavailable and the names Boletus glutinosus Krombh. or B. spadiceus Krombh. (non Fr.) would have to be used instead.

The species name is the Latin adjective badia, meaning "chestnut brown". The common name is likewise derived from the colour of the cap, likened to the coat of a bay horse. Alternate common names of a similar derivation include bay-brown bolete and bay-capped bolete, and it is known as bolet bai in French. It is also known as the false cep. Variety glaber was named for its smooth (Latin: glaber, "without hairs") stipe, and macrostipitatus for its large (Latin: macro, "large") stipe.

== Description ==
Imleria badia fruit bodies have a chestnut to dark brown cap, which is almost spherical in young specimens before broadening and flattening out to a diameter of up to 10 cm (4 in). The cap has an acute margin and a velvety surface when young, being slightly sticky when wet or old. The cap cuticle is difficult to separate from the flesh underneath. On the cap undersurface, the pores are initially cream to pale yellow, but become greenish yellow or olive with age. They stain dull blue to bluish-grey when bruised or cut, and are easily removed from the flesh. The pores are initially circular, becoming more angular with age, and number about one or two per millimetre. The tubes are 0.8–1.5 cm (3/8–5/8 in) long, and are adnate to depressed around the area of attachment to the stipe.

The flesh is mostly whitish or yellowish in some places; underneath the cap cuticle, it is brownish-pink or reddish brown. Initially firm, it begins to soften under the cap in older mushrooms. In some parts of the cap, such as the junction of the cap and the stipe, the flesh stains pale blue when injured or exposed to air, particularly in damp weather. This change is sometimes faint, and not persistent, as it eventually reverts to its original colour. The stipe is 4–9 cm (1 1/2–3 1/2 in) long by 1–2 cm (1/2–3/4 in) thick, and is similar in colour to the cap but paler, and sometimes with a rose-coloured tinge. Its surface has faint longitudinal ridges, a fine powdering, and fine reticulations (a net-like pattern of ridges) at the apex. It often has a whitish region at the base and the top, and white mycelium at the base. Unlike the bulbous stipe of many other boletes, the stipe of B. badius remains relatively slim and cylindrical. The flesh of the stipe gets tougher with age. Its smell has been described as fruity.

The spore print is olive to olive-brown. The smooth spores are somewhat oblong to slightly ventricose (fattened in the middle), and measure 10–14 by 4–5 μm. The basidia (spore-bearing cells) are four-spored and measure 25–35 by 8–10 μm. Pleurocystidia (cystidia found on the faces of the tubes) are fuse-shaped and ventricose, with dimensions of 50–60 by 10–14 μm.

Variety B. b. macrostipitatus differs from the main form by its grey-orange cap, shorter stipe measuring 5–7 cm (2–3 in), longer spores (15–18 by 4–5 μm), and longer pleurocystidia (30–55 by 10–14 μm). The variety B. b. glaber has a smooth (glabrous) stipe, and smaller pleurocystidia (35–40 by 10–15 μm) and cheilocystidia (25–30 by 9–12 μm).

Several chemical tests can be used to help identify the mushroom. A drop of ammonium hydroxide solution turns the cap cuticle a greenish to bluish colour. Application of iron(II) sulphate solution causes the flesh to stain a dull bluish-green, while the pores turn golden brown with a drop of dilute potassium hydroxide.

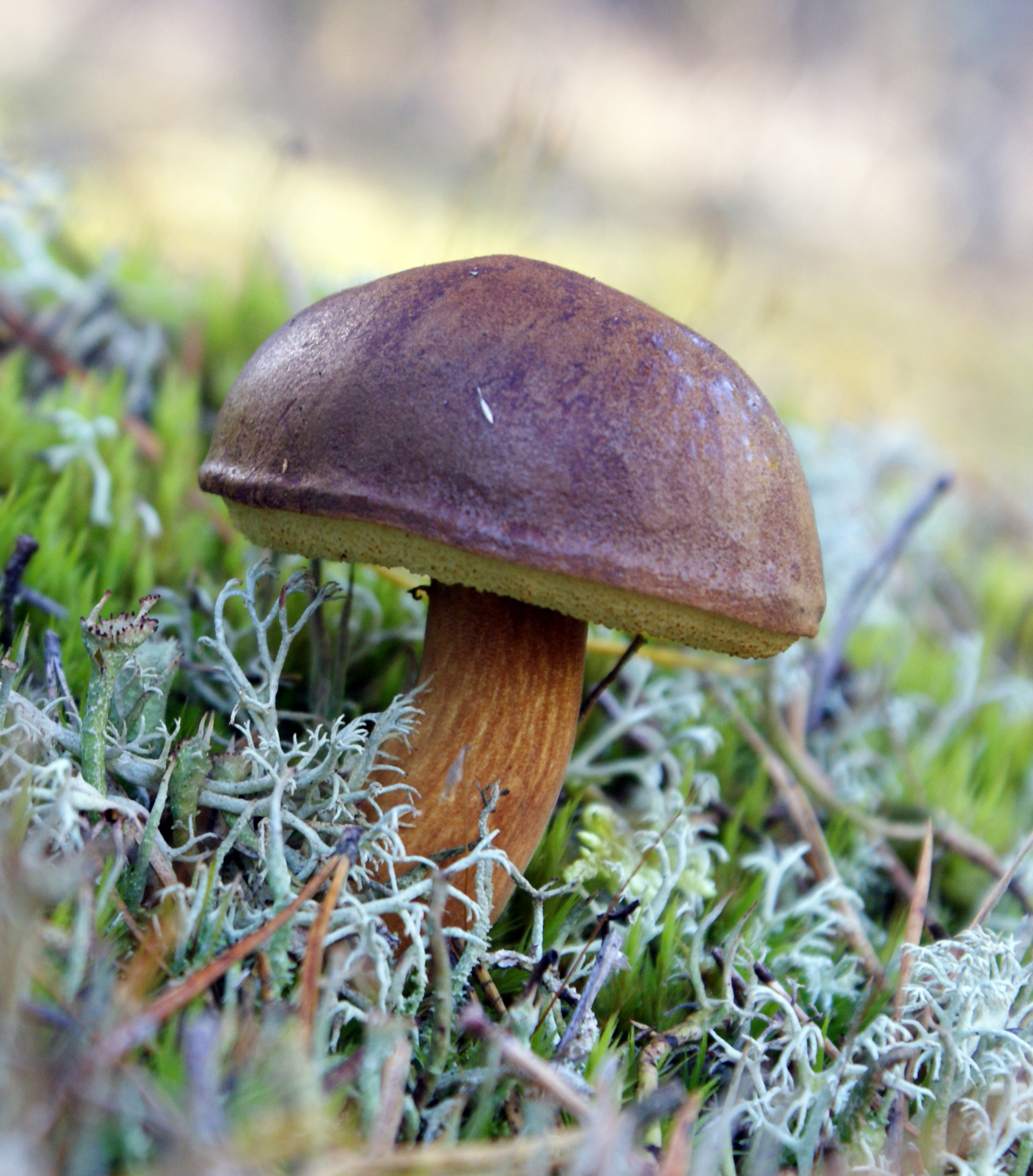
Dry specimen

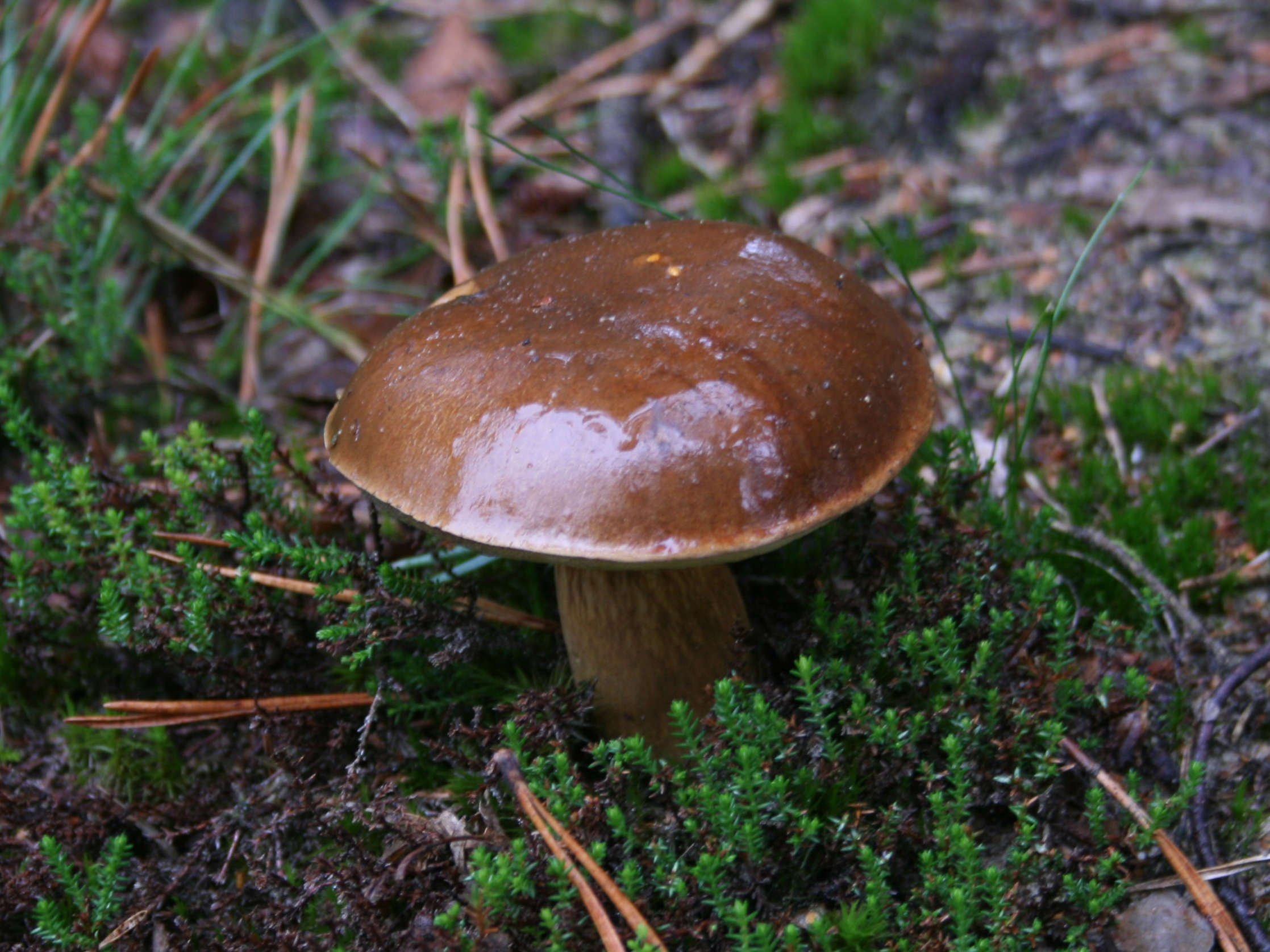
With wet and sticky cap

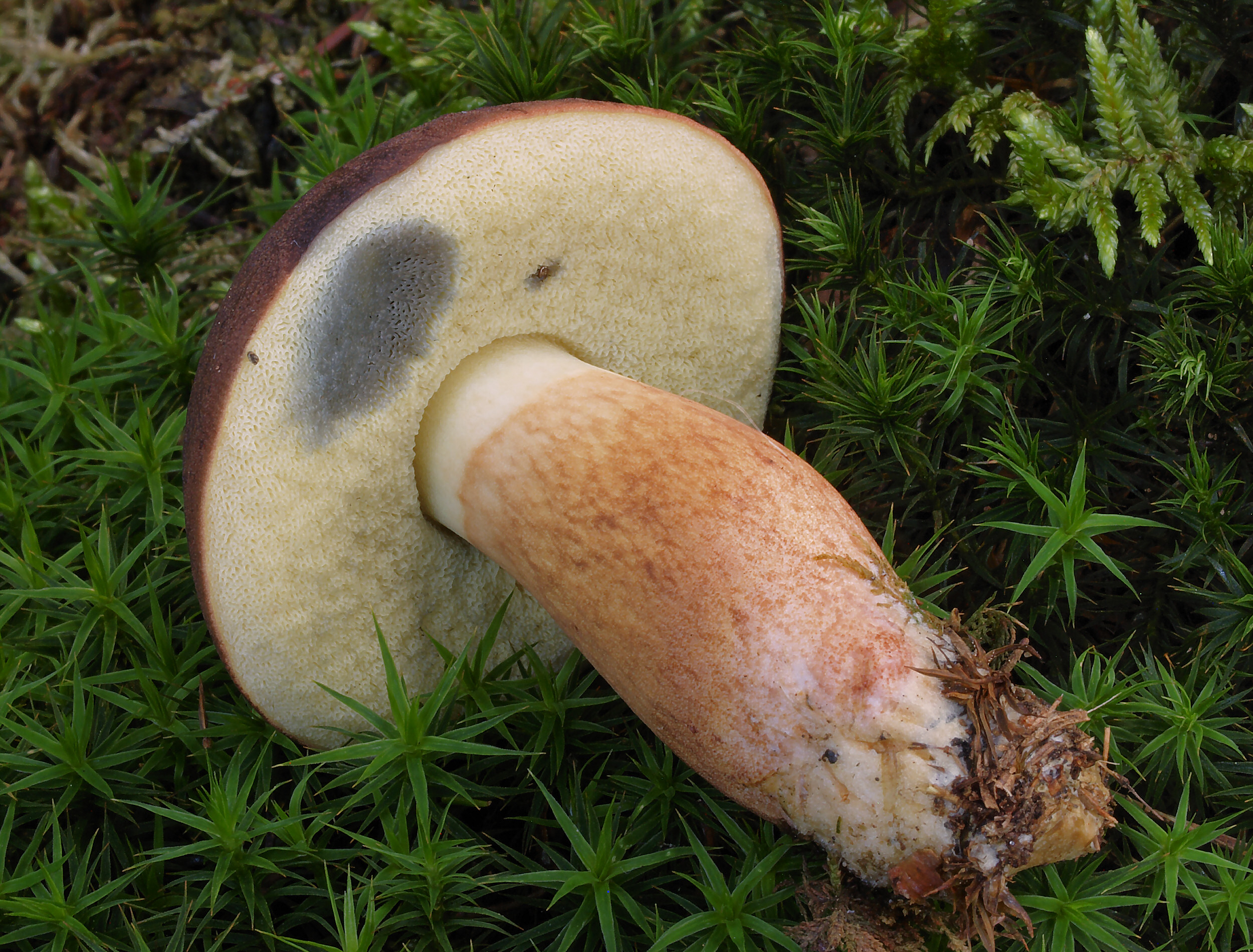
Dark stain of injured pores

=== Similar species ===
The similar colouration may cause confusion with Boletus projectellus, but the latter species is usually more robust, and has a reticulated stipe. Additionally, B. projectellus has the largest spores in the Boletaceae, up to about 30 μm in diameter. Another lookalike is Austroboletus gracilis, but this species does not have a blue bruising reaction, and its pore surface is initially white before turning pinkish. Compared to I. badia, B. subtomentosus fruit bodies have narrower stipes, paler brown, dry caps, and wider pores that do not stain blue on bruising. This latter species is not as good to eat. In western North America, I. badia is replaced by the similar B. zelleri, which also grows both on the ground and on rotten wood. The European species Xerocomus bubalinus can be mistaken for I. badia, but it has a paler yellow-brown cap flushed with pinkish-red, and is not sticky when wet.

== Distribution and habitat ==
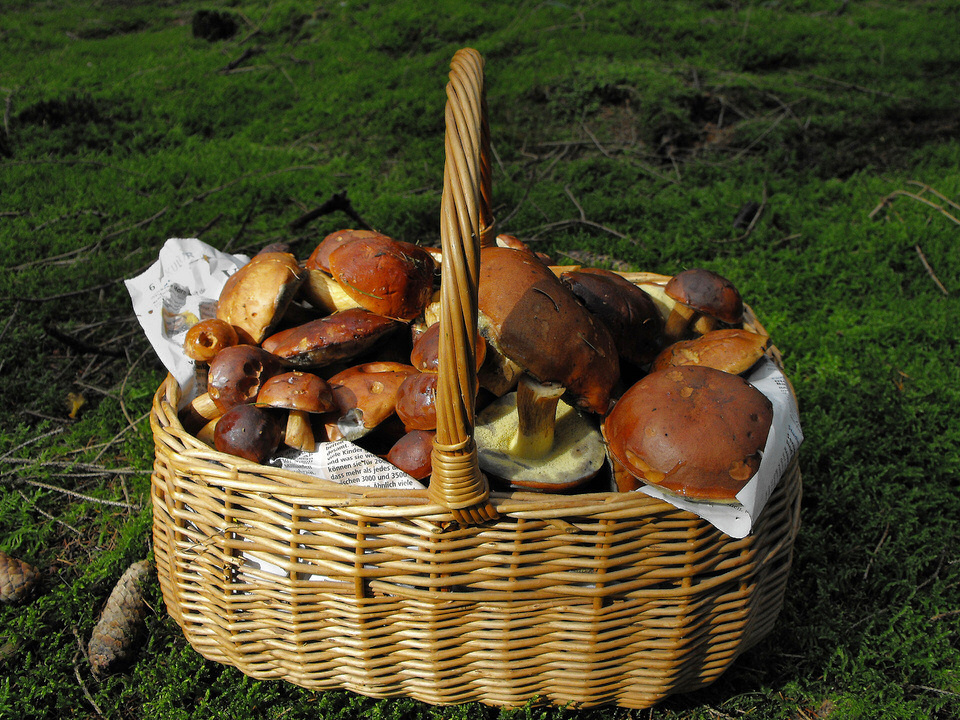
The mushrooms often appear in huge numbers, allowing for large collections.

The bay bolete is common in coniferous and less commonly mixed woodlands in Europe, from the British Isles, where it is abundant throughout from August to November, east to the Black Sea Region in Turkey. In Asia, the species has been recorded from Jordan mainland China, and Taiwan. The North American distribution extends from eastern Canada west to Minnesota and south to North Carolina, where the mushroom fruits from July to November. It also grows in central Mexico. The variety B. b. macrostipitatus is found from eastern Canada south to Maine and New York state, while variety B. b. glaber is known from the Atlantic Maritime Ecozone of eastern Canada.

Fruit bodies appear singly or scattered on the ground, or on decaying tree stumps, and can be well hidden by pine needles and ferns. Fruiting tends to peak three or four days after rain during warm weather. They can be prolific, especially in highland areas that are humid and shady. The species is commonly found under white pine, spruce, and hemlock, and also occurs under deciduous trees, especially beech. It can also occur in grassy or mossy areas at or near forest margins; Italian restaurateur and cook Antonio Carluccio recalled picking them in the grounds of Blenheim Palace. It does not occur on calcareous (chalky) soils.

== Ecology ==
Although the bay bolete is predominantly a mycorrhizal species, it has some saprophytic tendencies it may be able to use in certain circumstances. The ectomycorrhizae formed between I. badia and spruce (Picea abies) have active hyphal sheaths and a higher potential to store nitrogen, phosphorus, potassium, magnesium, iron, and zinc than other mycorrhizal types, indicating the fungus is well adapted to acidic stands and its mycorrhizae are very efficient in uptake and storage of macronutrients. Mycorrhizae with Monterey pine (Pinus radiata) have also been described.

I. badia fruit bodies are less affected by insects than other boletes. Orbatid mites such as Carabodes femoralis, Nothrus silvestris and Oribatula tibialis eat them, as do squirrels. Several microbial pathogens can damage the fruit bodies, and have had an effect on populations in China, including soft rot caused by Pseudomonas aeruginosa, and black mould caused by Mucor, Sepedonium, Paecilomyces, and Diasporangium species.

== Uses ==
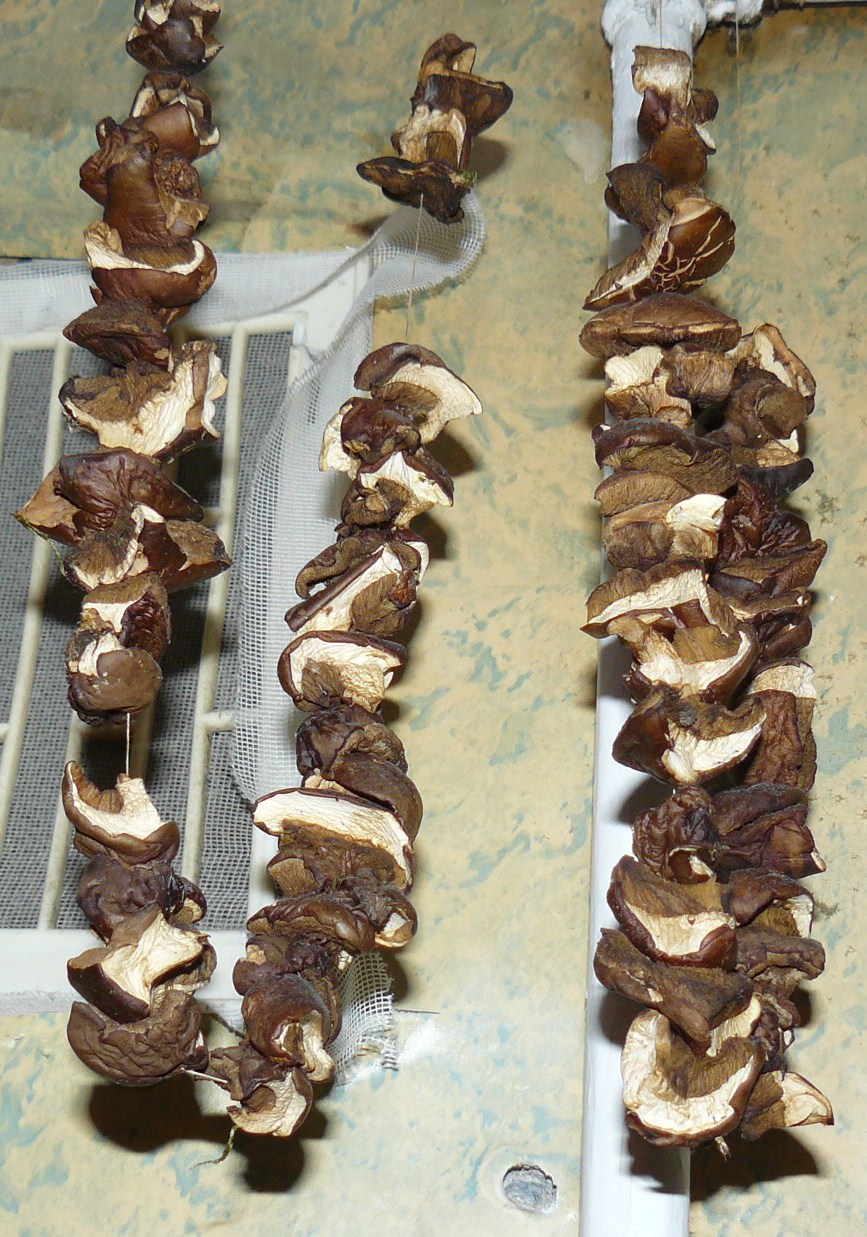
Dried in Poland

Often considered a poor relation of the cep (Boletus edulis), the bay bolete is nevertheless highly regarded as a choice edible mushroom by some authors such as Carluccio. In central Mexico, it is collected from Izta-Popo Zoquiapan National Park and sold in neighbouring markets. It may cause an allergic reaction in some people, and the blue discolouration upon bruising can be offputting, although the staining disappears from white flesh when it is cooked. The flavour is milder than its better-known relative. Younger specimens are best for eating, though more mature ones can be suitable for cutting up and drying. The tendency for the pores to absorb water means that wiping rather than washing is recommended before use in the kitchen. Unlike most boletes, I. badia can be eaten raw (though only young mushrooms should be used). Otherwise it can be fried in butter, or used with meat or fish recipes. Mushrooms can also be frozen, dried, or pickled in cider vinegar, wine, or extra virgin olive oil, and later used in sauces or soups.

The fruit bodies can be used to make mushroom dyes. Depending on the mordant used, colours ranging from yellow, orange, gold, and green-brown can be obtained. Without mordant, a yellow colour is produced.

== Research ==
In laboratory experiments, extracts of I. badia fruit bodies have been shown to have significant antioxidative properties in vitro. Fruit bodies contain the compound theanine, an amino acid and a glutamic acid analogue found in green tea. Efforts have been made to establish a protocol for producing theanine by growing the fungus mycelium using submerged fermentation. Several indole compounds have been detected in fruit bodies. Unprocessed mushrooms contain tryptophan (0.68 mg per 100 g dry weight), tryptamine (0.47), serotonin (0.52), kynurenine sulphate (1.96), and kynurenic acid (1.57). Due to their temperature sensitivity, cooking significantly changes the contents and composition of indole compounds: cooked mushrooms contained tryptophan (1.74 mg/100 g dw), 5-methyltryptophan (6.55), melatonin (0.71), and indoleacetonitrile (2.07). Fruit body extracts have been shown to slow the growth of certain tumour cell lines in cell culture.

Polish studies found that although the mushroom bioaccumulates mercury and cobalt from the soil, occasional consumption of mushrooms should not cause maximum allowable intake doses to be exceeded. Similar conclusions about safety were made in a Polish study of the mushroom's ability to accumulate organochlorine compounds. Different methods of preparation for consumption affect the leaching rate of cadmium, lead, and mercury. After the 1986 Chernobyl disaster, several studies showed that I. badia bioaccumulates radioactive caesium, ^{137}Cs. ^{137}Cs is produced in nuclear power plants following the chain decay of ^{235}U to ^{137}Te, and has a half-life of thirty years. A German study showed that mushrooms collected from 1986 to 1988 had radiocaesium contents that were 8.3 to 13.6 times greater than mushrooms collected before the accident in 1985. This caesium-sequestering effect is caused by a brown pigment, the polyphenol compound norbadione A, which is related to a family of mushroom pigments known as pulvinic acids. Norbadione A has been investigated for its ability to provide a protective effect against the damaging effects of ionizing radiation. Tests with cell cultures and mice show that although it has some protective effect, it is toxic to cells in higher doses. A new series of alkali chelators based on the structure of norbadione A has been reported. The mushroom may have potential as a bioremediation agent to clean up contaminated sites.

== See also ==
- List of North American boletes
