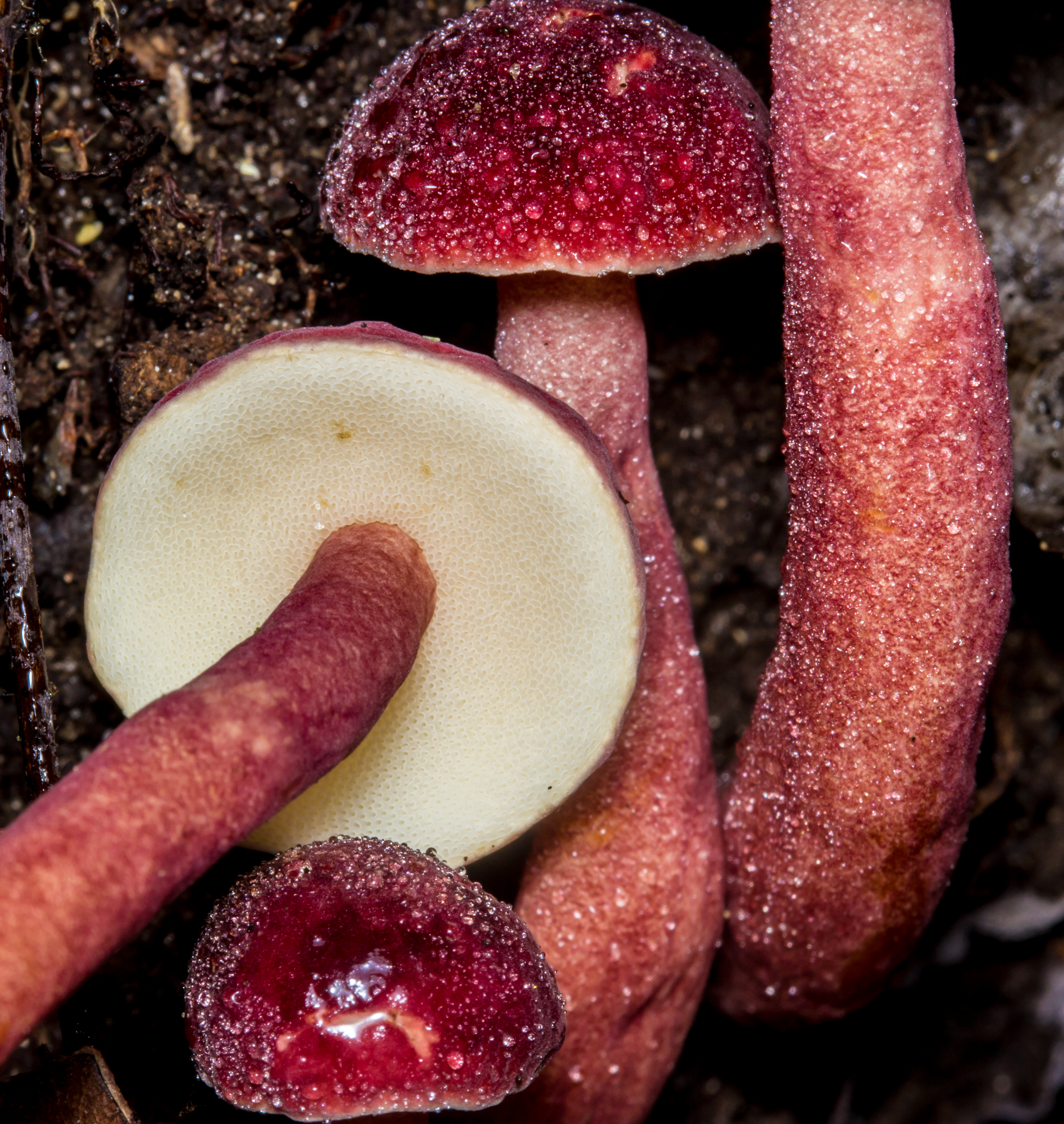

Scientific classification
- Domain: Eukaryota
- Kingdom: Fungi
- Division: Basidiomycota
- Class: Agaricomycetes
- Order: Boletales
- Family: Gyroporaceae
- Genus: Gyroporus
- Species: G. purpurinus

Binomial name
- Gyroporus purpurinus Singer ex Davoodian & Halling (2013)

Synonyms
- Boletus castaneus f. purpurinus Snell (1936); Gyroporus purpurinus (Snell) Singer (1946)

= Gyroporus purpurinus =

Species of fungus

Gyroporus purpurinus is a species of bolete fungus in the family Gyroporaceae. Found in eastern North America, it was first described in 1936 by Wally Snell as a form of Boletus castaneus. Snell and Rolf Singer transferred it to Gyroporus a decade later. Neither of these publications were valid according to the rules of botanical nomenclature, which at the time mandated a description in Latin. In 2013, Roy Halling and Naveed Davoodian published the name validly.

The species is edible.

== See also ==
- List of North American boletes
