= Carabodes femoralis =

Scientific classification
- Kingdom: Animalia
- Phylum: Arthropoda
- Subphylum: Chelicerata
- Class: Arachnida
- Order: Oribatida
- Family: Carabodidae
- Genus: Carabodes
- Species: C. femoralis

Binomial name
- Carabodes femoralis (Nicolet, 1855)

Species of mite

Carabodes femoralis is a species of mite in the family Carabodidae. It was originally described as a species of Tegeocranus in 1855 by Swiss lithographer and entomologist Hercule Nicolet. It feeds on the fruit bodies of the bolete mushroom Boletus badius.
