= Carabodes higginsi =

Scientific classification
- Domain: Eukaryota
- Kingdom: Animalia
- Phylum: Arthropoda
- Subphylum: Chelicerata
- Class: Arachnida
- Order: Oribatida
- Family: Carabodidae
- Genus: Carabodes
- Species: C. higginsi

Binomial name
- Carabodes higginsi Reeves, 1988

Species of mite

Carabodes higginsi is a species of mite in the family Carabodidae. Found in North America, it was described as a new species in 1988 by botanist Robert Gatlin Reeves. It occurs in the northeastern United States and in the Maritime Provinces of Canada. The mite is named after a friend of the author, Harold G. Higgins of Salt Lake City, Utah. A study conducted in New York that showed that the mite is one of several that takes shelter in the thallus of the common North American lichen Punctelia rudecta.
