= Gyrocyanin =

Names
- IUPAC name 4-hydroxy-2,5-bis(4-hydroxyphenyl)-4-Cyclopentene-1,3-dione

Identifiers
CAS Number	52591-12-5
3D model (JSmol)	Interactive image
ChEBI	CHEBI:174127
ChemSpider	35013702
PubChem CID	71438153
CompTox Dashboard (EPA)	DTXSID201180617
- InChI: InChI=1S/C17H12O5/c18-11-5-1-9(2-6-11)13-15(20)14(17(22)16(13)21)10-3-7-12(19)8-4-10/h1-8,13,18-19,22H Key: DIFAFZFNMSLGGN-UHFFFAOYSA-N
- SMILES: O=C1C(O)=C(C(=O)C1C2=CC=C(O)C=C2)C=3C=CC(O)=CC3

Properties
Chemical formula	C_{17}H_{12}O_{5}
Molar mass	296.278 g·mol^{−1}
- Except where otherwise noted, data are given for materials in their standard state (at 25 °C [77 °F], 100 kPa). Infobox references

Gyrocyanin is a 2,5-diarylcyclopentane-1,3-dione natural product found in the sporophores (fruiting bodies) of several species of bolete fungus in the family Gyroporaceae, including Gyroporus cyanescens.

It is likely that the blue staining of psychoactive bolete Lanmaoa asiatica is due to gyrocyanin or a related compound, since this species is not known to produce the psilocybin or psilocin that leads to blue staining of Psilocybe cubensis and related psychoactive fungi.

== Related compounds ==
- Involutin
