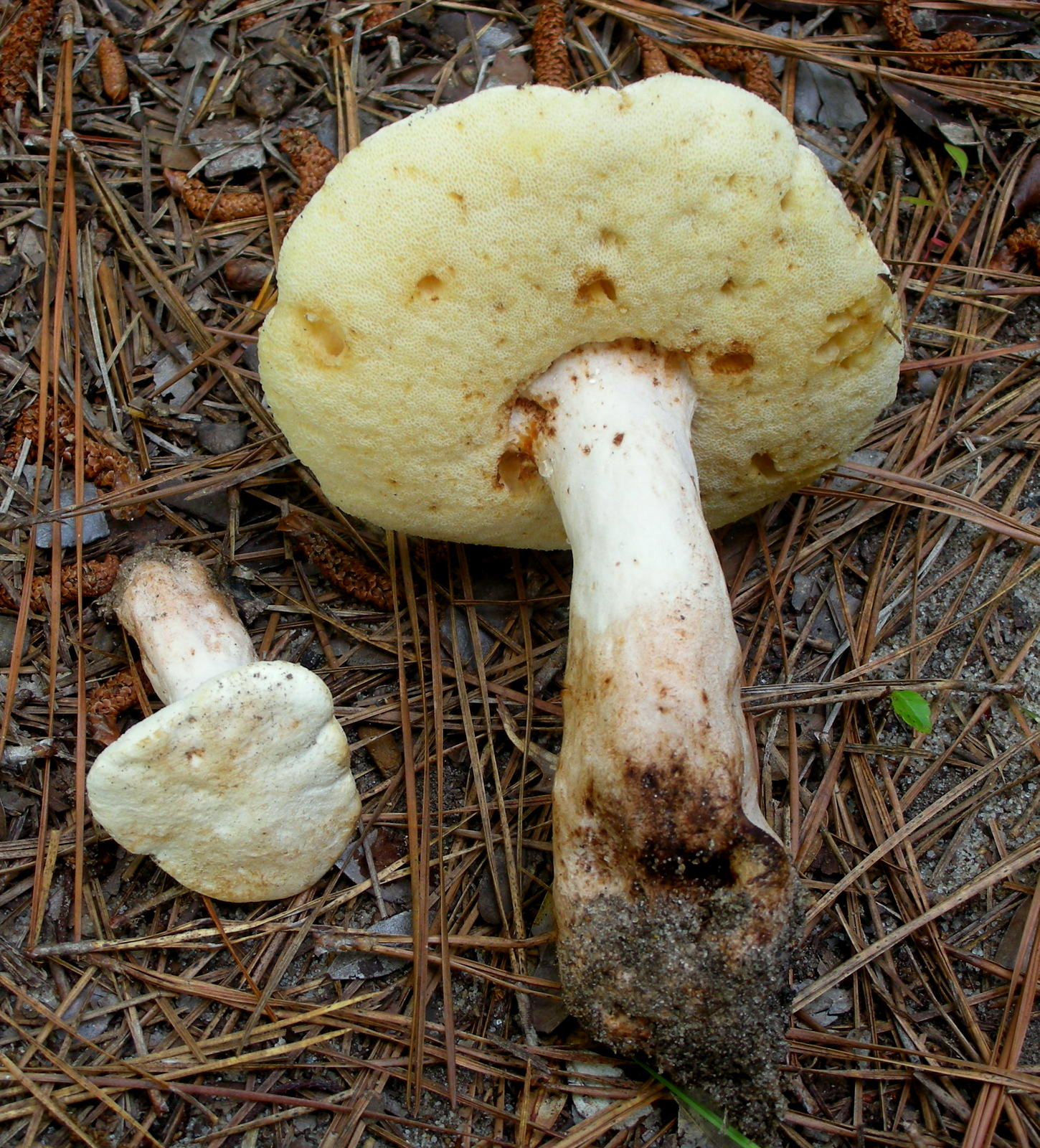

Scientific classification
- Domain: Eukaryota
- Kingdom: Fungi
- Division: Basidiomycota
- Class: Agaricomycetes
- Order: Boletales
- Family: Gyroporaceae
- Genus: Gyroporus
- Species: G. subalbellus

Binomial name
- Gyroporus subalbellus Murrill (1910)

Synonyms
- Suillus subalbellus (Murrill) Sacc. & Trotter (1912)

= Gyroporus subalbellus =

Species of fungus

Gyroporus subalbellus is a species of bolete fungus in the family Gyroporaceae. Found in North America, it was described by American mycologist William Alphonso Murrill in 1910. Edible.

== See also ==
- List of North American boletes
