= Neolucoppia =

Scientific classification
- Domain: Eukaryota
- Kingdom: Animalia
- Phylum: Arthropoda
- Subphylum: Chelicerata
- Class: Arachnida
- Order: Oribatida
- Family: Oribatulidae
- Genus: Neolucoppia; Tseng, 1984

Genus of spiders

Neolucoppia is a genus of mites belonging to the family Oribatulidae.

Species:

- Neolucoppia luculenta Tseng, 1984
