= Gyroporus umbrinosquamosus =

Scientific classification
- Kingdom: Fungi
- Division: Basidiomycota
- Class: Agaricomycetes
- Order: Boletales
- Family: Gyroporaceae
- Genus: Gyroporus
- Species: G. umbrinosquamosus

Binomial name
- Gyroporus umbrinosquamosus Murrill (1939)

Synonyms
- Boletus umbrinisquamosus (Murrill) Murrill (1939)

Species of fungus

Gyroporus umbrinosquamosus is a species of bolete fungus in the family Gyroporaceae. Found in North America, it was first described scientifically by mycologist William Alphonso Murrill in 1939.
