= Punctelia eganii =

Scientific classification
- Kingdom: Fungi
- Division: Ascomycota
- Class: Lecanoromycetes
- Order: Lecanorales
- Family: Parmeliaceae
- Genus: Punctelia
- Species: P. eganii

Binomial name
- Punctelia eganii B.P.Hodk. & Lendemer (2011)

Species of lichen

Punctelia eganii is a rare species of foliose lichen in the family Parmeliaceae. It was described in 2011 from a single population found in a beech-magnolia forest along the Alabama River and was named in honor of American lichenologist Robert S. Egan. The lichen appears very similar to the common species Punctelia rudecta, but can be distinguished by tiny white pores that glow bright yellow under ultraviolet light due to the chemical compound lichexanthone, otherwise unknown to occur in the genus. It is known only from its original discovery site in coastal Alabama, where habitat destruction from agriculture and development may have reduced its range.

== Taxonomy ==
Punctelia eganii was described in 2011 by Brendan Hodkinson and James Lendemer after a single population was discovered in coastal plain Alabama. Morphologically it matches the widespread P. rudecta, but it synthesizes lichexanthone—a yellow fluorescent compound previously unknown in Punctelia—making it chemically distinct within the genus. The authors treated the chemical difference as evidence of a separate species rather than an infraspecific chemotype, noting that lichexanthone has not been detected in other Punctelia taxa and that chemical characters often track species boundaries in parmelioid lichens. The epithet honors the American lichenologist Robert S. Egan, who collected the type and recognized its unusual chemistry.

== Description ==
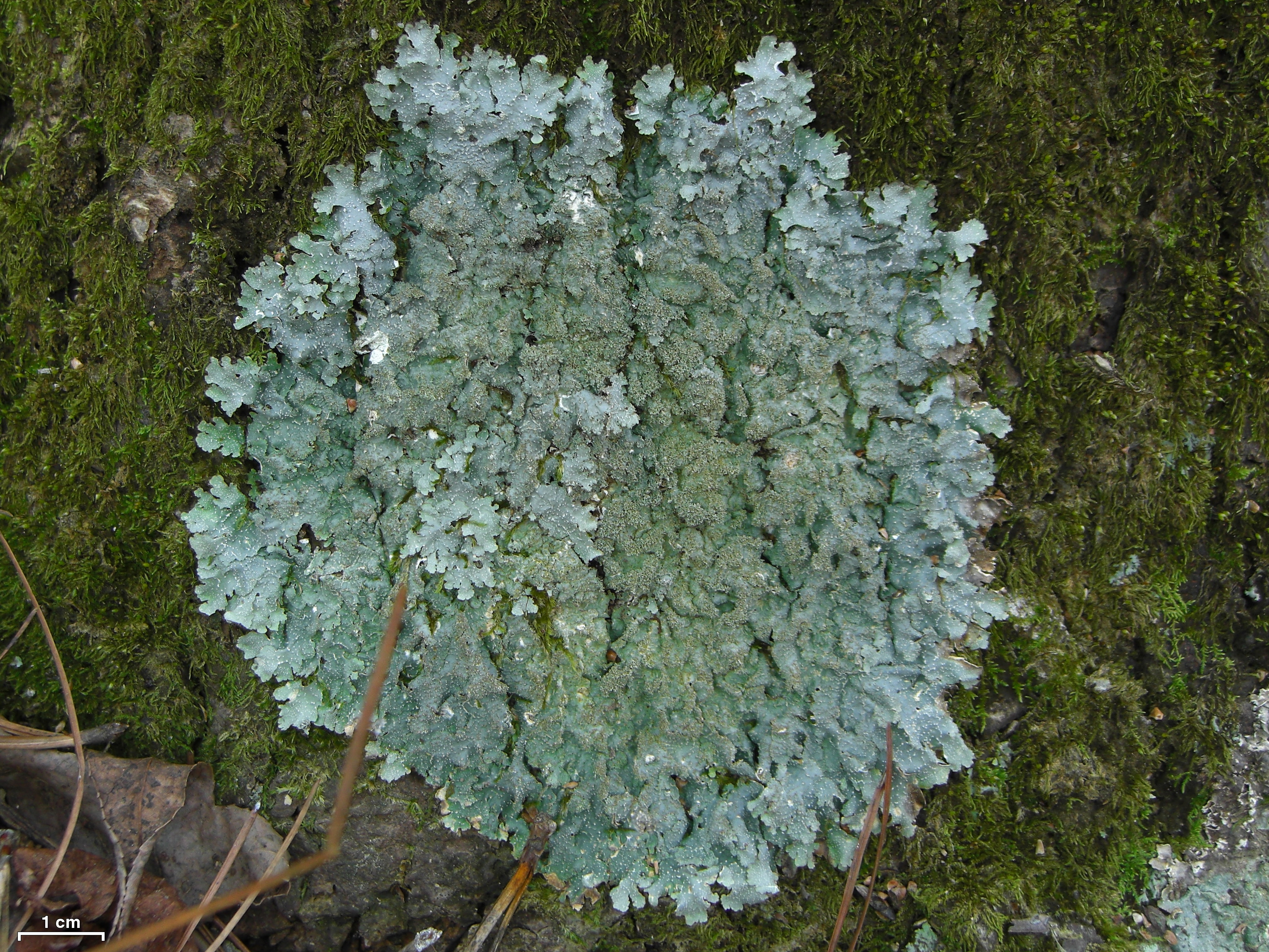
The common Punctelia rudecta (pictured) closely resembles P. eganii.

The lichen forms a pale gray-green foliose (leaf-like) thallus up to several centimeters across. Lobes are 1–2.5 mm wide, irregularly branched and often overlap; their tips are rounded and sometimes edged by a narrow brown band. The upper surface is smooth and lacks scrobicules (shallow pits), but bears abundant cylindrical to coral-like isidia that are corticate and brown-tipped. Tiny white pores called pseudocyphellae (0.1–0.3 mm) are scattered across the blade. The medulla is white; the lower surface is whitish to pale brown with sparse, simple rhizines up to about 1 mm long.

Chemical tests show atranorin in low concentration, lecanoric acid in the medulla, and lichexanthone confined to the pseudocyphellae. The last compound gives the pores a vivid yellow glow under long-wavelength ultraviolet light, a quick field character that separates P. eganii from P. rudecta. No apothecia or pycnidia have been observed to occur in this species.

== Habitat and distribution ==
The species is known only from its type locality—a beech–magnolia forest fragment along the Alabama River (Haines Island Park, Monroe County, Alabama, 50 ft or about 15 m elevation) where it grew on tree bark. Although it may once have been more widespread, the surrounding coastal-plain landscape has been heavily altered by agriculture and urbanization, leaving natural habitats isolated and possibly reducing the lichen's range. It is also plausible that the species remains under-collected because, aside from its UV-reactive pores, it closely mimics the common P. rudecta.
