= Carabodes =

Scientific classification
- Kingdom: Animalia
- Phylum: Arthropoda
- Subphylum: Chelicerata
- Class: Arachnida
- Order: Oribatida
- Family: Carabodidae
- Genus: Carabodes; Koch, 1835

Genus of mites

Carabodes is a genus of mites belonging to the family Carabodidae.

The genus has almost cosmopolitan distribution.

== Species ==
Species:

- Carabodes affinis Berlese, 1913
- Carabodes agenjoi Pérez-Íñigo, 1969
- Carabodes andasibe Mahunka, 1993
- Carabodes dedzaensis
- Carabodes femoralis
- Carabodes higginsi
- Carabodes labyrinthicus
- Carabodes marginatus
- Carabodes willmani
