= Involutin =

Names
- Preferred IUPAC name (4S,5R)-5-(3,4-Dihydroxyphenyl)-3,4-dihydroxy-2-(4-hydroxyphenyl)cyclopent-2-en-1-one

Identifiers
CAS Number	13677-78-6
3D model (JSmol)	Interactive image
ChemSpider	68023767
PubChem CID	71435043
- InChI: InChI=1S/C17H14O6/c18-10-4-1-8(2-5-10)13-15(21)14(17(23)16(13)22)9-3-6-11(19)12(20)7-9/h1-7,13,16,18-20,22-23H Key: JDHDWVVITVZZFY-UHFFFAOYSA-N
- SMILES: O[C@H]1[C@H](C(=O)C(=C1O)C1=CC=C(O)C=C1)C1=CC=C(O)C(O)=C1

Properties
Chemical formula	C_{17}H_{14}O_{6}
Molar mass	314.293 g·mol^{−1}
- Except where otherwise noted, data are given for materials in their standard state (at 25 °C [77 °F], 100 kPa). Infobox references

Involutin is an organic compound that can be found in mushrooms belonging to the genus Paxillus. It is part of a class of compounds known as diarylcyclopentenones. It is derived from atromentin which was shown from 3′,3″,5′,5″-d4-atromentin (deuterated atromentin) feeding studies and observing the deuterated incorporation into two atromentin derivatives (i.e., an increase in monoisotopic mass by 4 mass units), gyrocyanin and its oxidation product gyroporin. It has been shown to be a Fe^{3+}-reductant and presumed to be involved in Fenton chemistry for the initial attack of dead plant matter.
