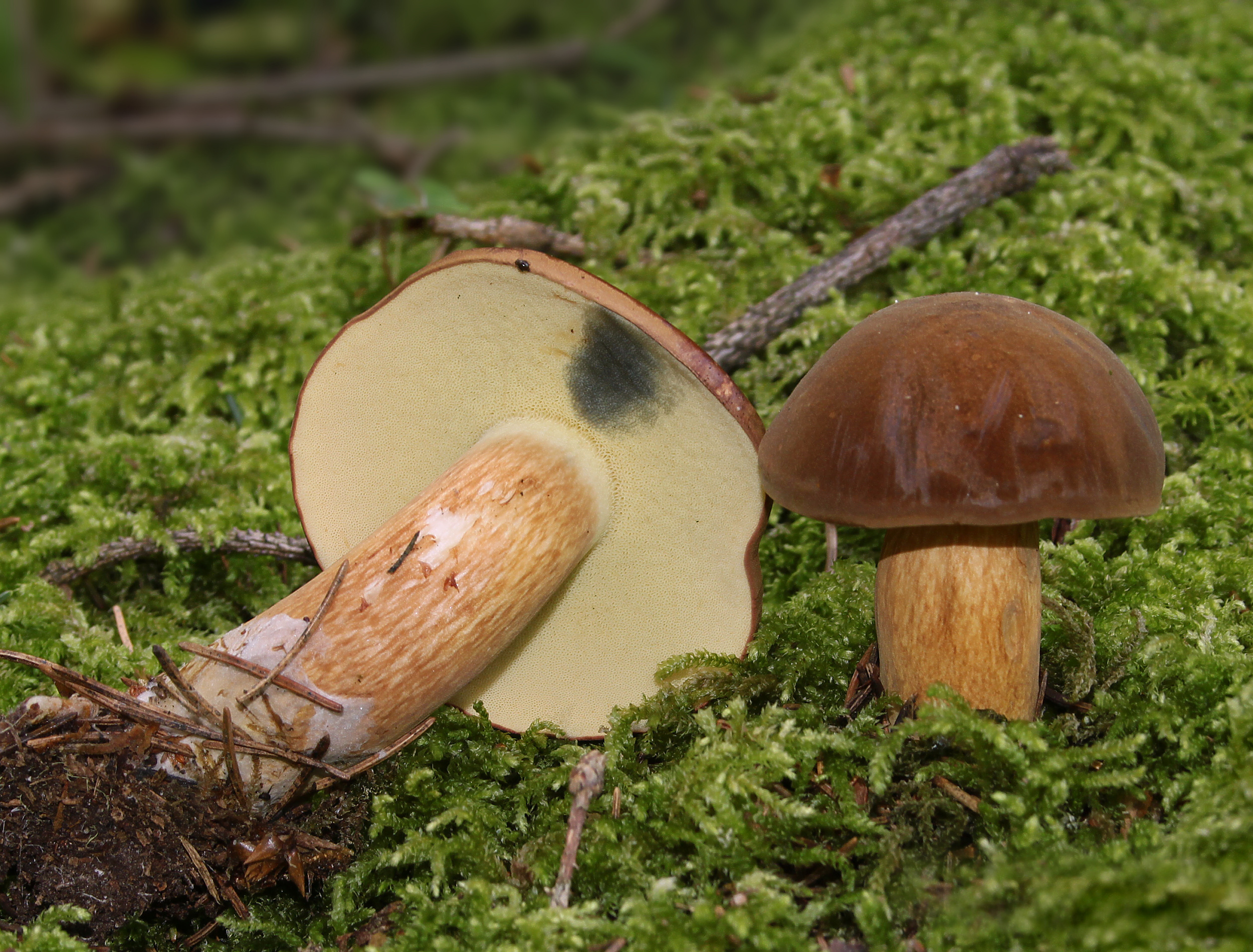
- Imleria badia

Scientific classification
- Kingdom: Fungi
- Division: Basidiomycota
- Class: Agaricomycetes
- Order: Boletales
- Family: Boletaceae
- Genus: Imleria; Vizzini (2014)

Type species
- Imleria badia (Fr.) Vizzini (2014)

Species
- See text

= Imleria =

Genus of fungi

Imleria is a genus of fungi in the family Boletaceae. It was established in 2014 by Alfredo Vizzini as a new genus for what had previously been named Boletus badius or Xerocomus badius. It was placed in its own genus because of its distinct morphological features and because it had previously been found to belong in its own genus in a molecular phylogenetics study by Gelardi et al. (2013). Zhu et al. (2014) placed three more species in Imleria. Species of Imleria which can be found in Europe, North America and Asia. The genus is named in honor of the Belgian mycologist Louis Imler (1900–1993).

== Species ==
Image	Scientific Name	Taxon author	Year	Distribution
	Imleria badia	(Fr.) Vizzini	2014 (1818)	Eurasia and North America
	Imleria floridana	A. Farid, A.R. Franck & J. Bolin	2020	Florida
	Imleria heteroderma	(J. Blum) T. Rödig	2015 (1970)	United Kingdom
	Imleria obscurebrunnea	(Hongo) Xue T. Zhu & Zhu L. Yang	2014 (1979)	China
	Imleria pallida	(Frost) A. Farid, A.R. Franck, & J. Bolin	2020 (1873)	Hidalgo, Mexico
	Imleria parva	Xue T. Zhu & Zhu L. Yang	2015	China
	Imleria subalpina	Xue T. Zhu & Zhu L. Yang	2015	China
