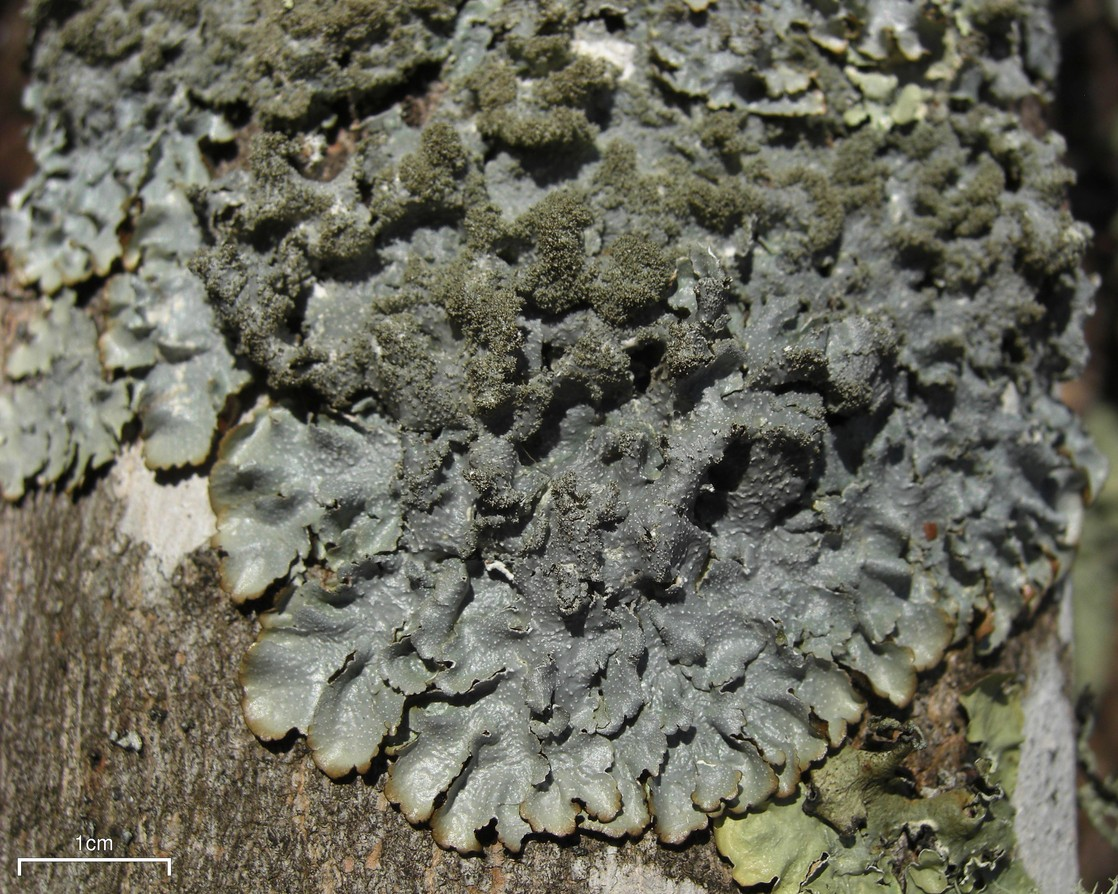
- In Cataloochee (Great Smoky Mountains), North Carolina; growing on the upper trunk of a red maple tree

Conservation status
- Secure (NatureServe)

Scientific classification
- Kingdom: Fungi
- Division: Ascomycota
- Class: Lecanoromycetes
- Order: Lecanorales
- Family: Parmeliaceae
- Genus: Punctelia
- Species: P. rudecta

Binomial name
- Punctelia rudecta (Ach.) Krog (1982)

Synonyms
- Parmelia rudecta Ach. (1814); Parmelia borreri var. rudecta (Ach.) Tuck. (1845); Imbricaria rudecta (Ach.) Jatta (1902); Parmelia borreri subsp. rudecta (Ach.) Fink (1910)

= Punctelia rudecta =

Species of lichen in the family Parmeliaceae

Punctelia rudecta, commonly known as the rough speckled shield or the speckleback lichen, is a North American species of foliose lichen in the family Parmeliaceae. This species can be readily identified by the light color of the thallus underside, the relatively large lobes at the edges of the thallus, and the tiny white pores present on the top of the thallus that are characteristic of the genus Punctelia. The lichen is quite abundant and widespread in the eastern and southeastern United States, and is less common in Canada and Mexico. The lichen usually grows on bark, and less commonly on shaded rocks. There are several lookalike Punctelia species; these can often be distinguished from P. rudecta by differences in distribution or in the nature of the reproductive structures present on the thallus.

Although Punctelia rudecta was previously thought to have a much more expansive global distribution, phylogenetic analysis revealed a species complex that has subsequently been split into four distinct cryptic lineages with more restricted distributional ranges. Punctelia rudecta is moderately sensitive to air pollution and has been assessed as a suitable candidate for biomonitoring air quality.

== Systematics ==
Swedish lichenologist Erik Acharius described the lichen as a new species in 1814 as Parmelia rudecta. The type specimen was collected by American clergyman and botanist Gotthilf Heinrich Ernst Muhlenberg. Historically, Edward Tuckerman thought that the taxon was better suited as a variety of Parmelia borreri, while Bruce Fink suggested that it should be a subspecies of that taxon. In 1902, Antonio Jatta proposed a transfer to genus Imbricaria; this genus name is no longer used for lichens and is considered a synonym of Anaptychia. In a 1962 study of specimens named as Parmelia ruderata from Japan, William Culberson proposed that it be placed in synonymy with P. rudecta, but this was not accepted by later workers and DNA evidence has since shown that Punctelia ruderata is an independent species. In 1982, Hildur Krog circumscribed the genus Punctelia to contain Parmelia species with rounded pseudocyphellae, and P. rudecta was one of the 22 species transferred to the new genus.

Parmelia rudecta is known colloquially as the "rough speckled shield" or the "speckleback lichen". It has also been called the "backyard buddy", alluding to the relatively high chance of finding this lichen in a backyard in the eastern United States.

=== Phylogeny ===
A 2004 molecular phylogenetic study of Punctelia species in the Iberian Peninsula suggested that the taxon Parmelia rudecta did not form a monophyletic grouping, indicating that more than one species was being represented by the taxon. This interpretation was later corroborated in a large-scale phylogenetic study of the family Parmeliaceae that was published in 2010. A 2016 followup study of P. rudecta specimens from collections around the world confirmed the suspected cryptic diversity: there were four morphologically similar, but geographically isolated species that were all being called Parmelia rudecta. Three of these species were epitypified (P. rudecta in the strict sense, P. toxodes and P. ruderata), and a fourth, P. guanchica, was described as a new species. Because the original type specimen of P. rudecta was collected in North America, this name was kept for the North American species. The epitype used in the 2016 study was collected in Great Smoky Mountains National Park, North Carolina.

== Description ==
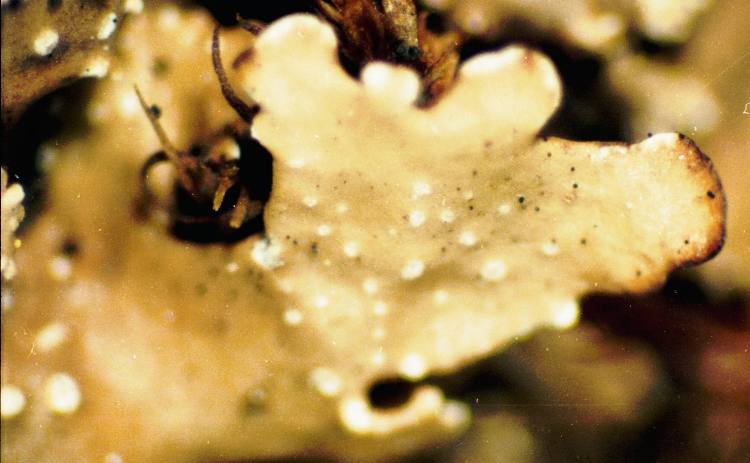
Herbarium specimen showing pseudocyphellae on a lobe and brown coloration of the lobe tip.

The thallus of Punctelia rudecta ranges in color from dark greenish-gray to almost blue-gray; it tends to be more gray-greenish when fresh, and more brown-yellowish when dry. The thallus has a relatively tight attachment to its substrate. The lobes comprising the thallus are mostly 3–8 mm (0.1–0.3 in) wide, and are more or less covered with cylindrical to branched isidia; the isidia are typically more numerous towards the center of the thallus. Sometimes the isidia can become so dense that they form mounds, obscuring the lobes underneath. Both the margins of the lobes and the tips of the isidia have a brown tinge. The lichen, when it has a bluish-green coloration and dense isidia, can be readily spotted from a distance. White pseudocyphellae are usually prominent on the tips of the lobes. The lower surface of the thallus is tan, with pale rhizines. Apothecia are uncommon. If present, they are up to 4 mm (0.16 in) in diameter, with a brown hymenium and thin margin rolled inward. The ascospores measure 12.8–16 by 8–9.6 μm, and are ellipsoid in shape. They lack septa, and are smooth, thin-walled, and hyaline. The photobiont partner is the green alga species Trebouxia anticipata.

Standard chemical tests can be used to help identify Punctelia rudecta. In the medulla, these results are PD-, K-, KC+ red, and C+ red. The last of these tests indicates the presence of lecanoric acid. The cortex contains atranorin, which results in a yellow K+ reaction.

=== Similar species ===
Punctelia rudecta is a member of a complex of several morphologically similar but geographically separated species. P. ruderata occurs in Asia and East Africa. P. guanchica, known only from the Canary Islands, grows on volcanic rocks. The South African member of the complex, Punctelia toxodes, grows on both tree bark and rocks.

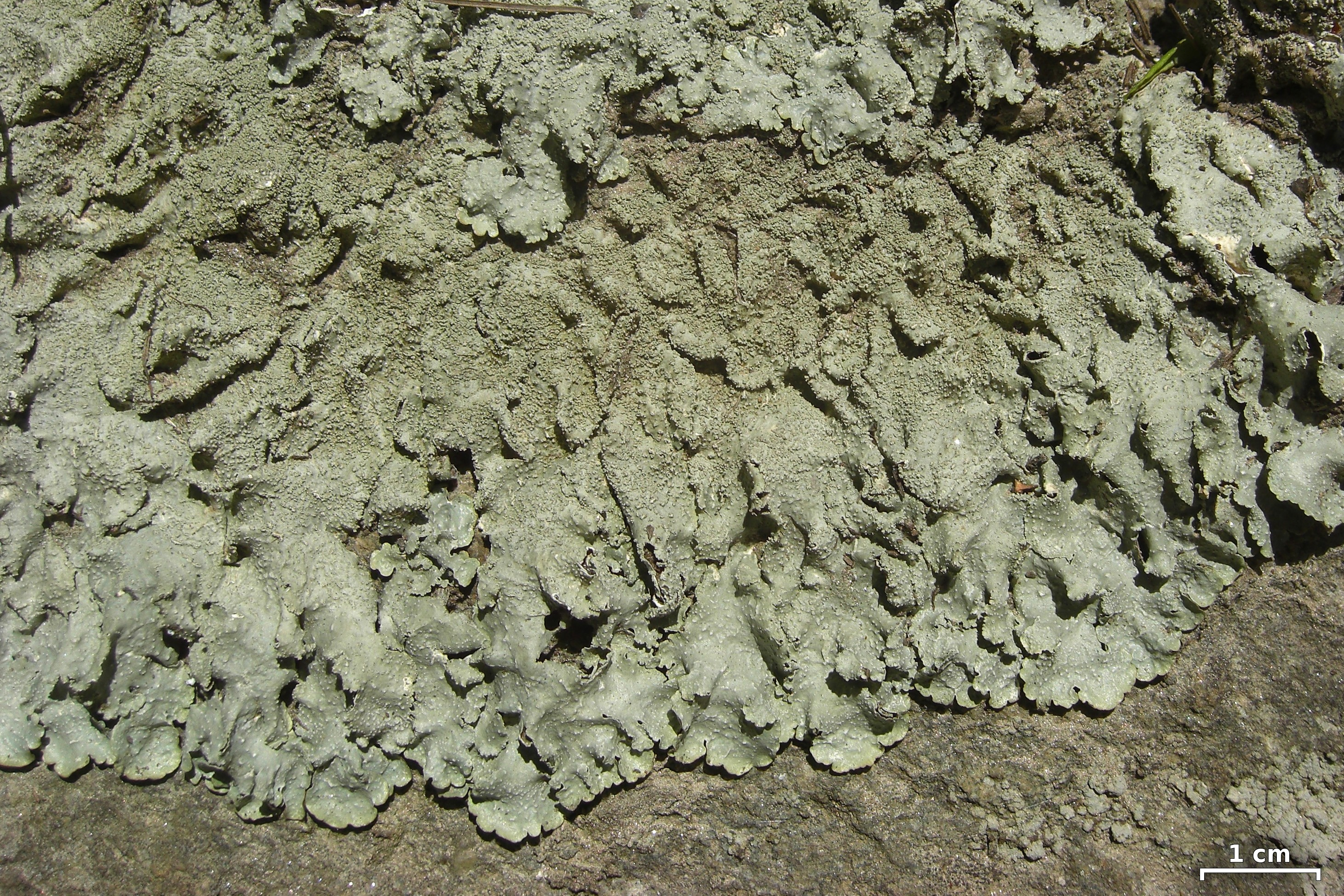
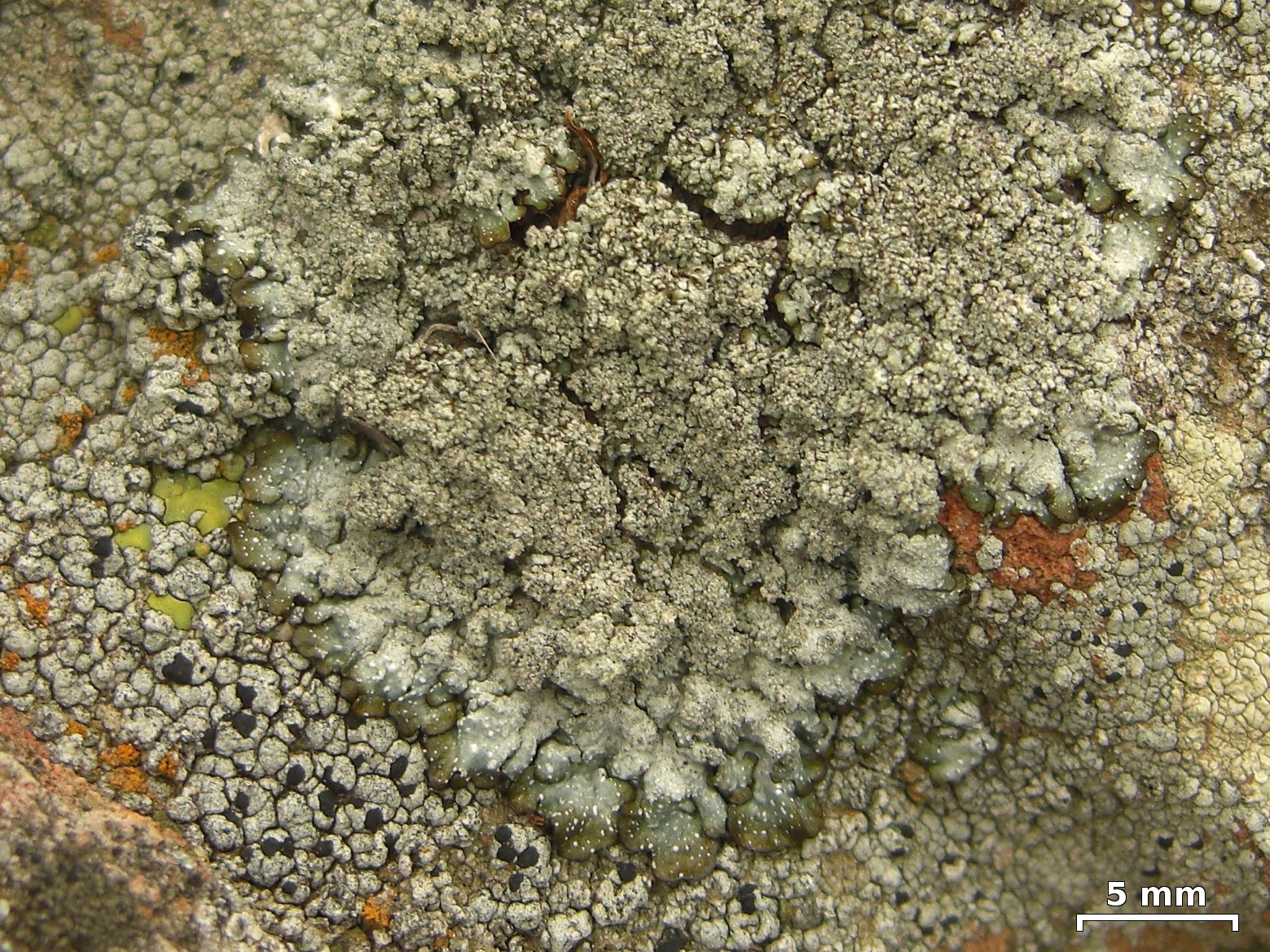
Two lookalikes of Punctelia rudecta are P. missouriensis (left) and P. punctilla (right).

Punctelia eganii, known from a single locality in Alabama, USA, was described as a new species in 2011. Although morphologically identical to P. rudecta, it produces lichexanthone, a secondary compound previously unknown in Punctelia. This compound, which is present only in its pseudocyphellae, causes these structures to fluoresce when viewed under ultraviolet light and allow these otherwise identical species to be distinguished from each other. Two other similar species are P. missouriensis and P. punctilla; these species are distinguished from P. rudecta by their propagules: they both produce ecorticate (without a cortex), scale-like soredia, structures that can be mistaken for isidia. Specimens of P. rudecta that have few isidia can be mistaken for the southwestern speckled shield lichen, P. hypoleucites. This relatively rare species has a range restricted to Texas and Mexico.

== Habitat and distribution ==
Punctelia rudecta has a temperate distribution in North America. Although the range maps included in some popular North American lichen field guides suggest that it does not occur in the tropical climate of southern Florida, it was recorded in Fakahatchee Strand Preserve State Park in 2011. It is occasionally recorded from western North America, but it is much less frequently encountered there. It grows on bark of all kinds, or on shaded rocks. Irwin Brodo calls it "one of the most common eastern isidiate foliose lichens", while Erin Tripp and James Lendemer express similar sentiments about its prevalence, describing it as "arguably the weediest macrolichen east of the Mississippi River". In its range it grows in all types of forests, and at all elevations. The lichen occurs in most Canadian provinces (Manitoba, New Brunswick, Nova Scotia, Ontario, Prince Edward Island, Quebec, and Saskatchewan). It has a national conservation status of "secure", and is "secure" or "apparently secure" in all provinces except Saskatchewan, where its status is "critically imperiled". In Mexico, it has been reported from the Distrito Federal, Chiapas, Veracruz, Jalisco, Baja California, Chihuahua, Durango and Sonora.

== Ecology ==
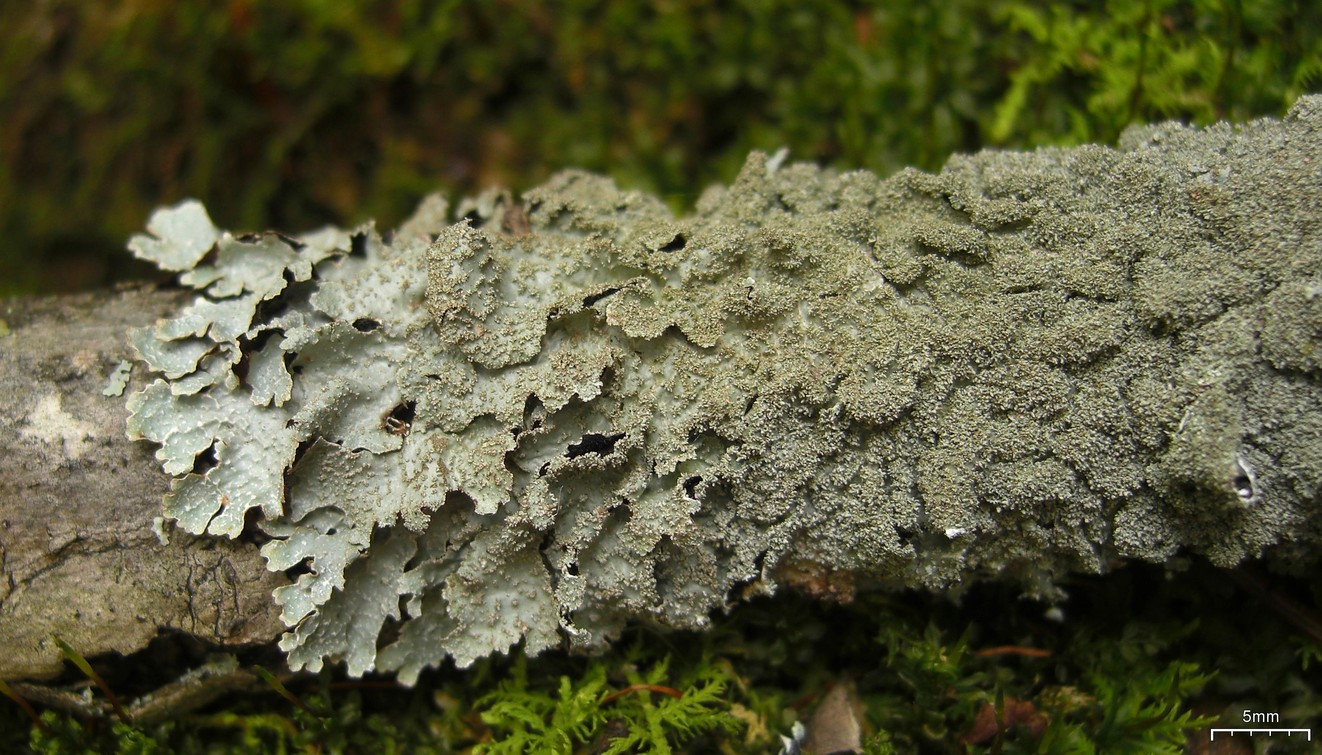
Punctelia rudecta growing on oak in Big Run State Park, Maryland

Punctelia rudecta has an annual radial (i.e., expanding outward from the center) growth rate of about 5 mm (0.2 in) per year, similar to other foliose lichens in the family Parmeliaceae. Ovicuculispora parmeliae (previously known as Nectria parmeliae) is a lichenicolous fungus that uses Punctelia rudecta as one of its many hosts. Laboratory studies established that this fungus is incapable of growing on Punctelia rudecta unless phenolic defense compounds are first removed from the lichen. In nature, O. parmeliae can grow on P. rudecta only after another lichen inhabitant, an epiphytic species of Fusarium, first enzymatically degrades lecanoric acid, the primary lichen compound of P. rudecta. Field studies demonstrated that lichens harboring N. parmeliae generally also harbor the Fusarium species. Other fungal parasites that have been recorded growing on P. rudecta include Trichosphaerella buckii, Pronectria subimperspicua, and an unidentified species of Cladophialophora.

A study conducted in New York showed that Punctelia rudecta provides shelter for several species of mites; Carabodes higginsi, Phauloppia banksi, and an undetermined species of Anachipteria were the most numerous species encountered. The mites may help with the dispersal of lichen spores.

== Biomonitoring studies ==
Based on the frequency of Punctelia rudecta in heavily polluted areas, it is considered a relatively pollution-tolerant species, although it is sensitive to ambient sulfur dioxide (SO_{2}), and will not grow unless airborne SO_{2} concentrations are low. It has been investigated for its potential use as an indicator of air quality in biomonitoring programs. To do this, the lichen is studied for effects on growth and for the accumulation of pollutants (such as toxic heavy metals) in the thallus, which, after collecting samples, can be determined in the laboratory with chemical techniques. Punctelia rudecta is recommended for use as a biomonitor in the cooler forested uplands of Alabama, Georgia, North Carolina and South Carolina.

== Human uses ==
Punctelia rudecta can be used to create a dye by a color-extraction with ammonia as a solvent. A pink color is obtained using this method.
