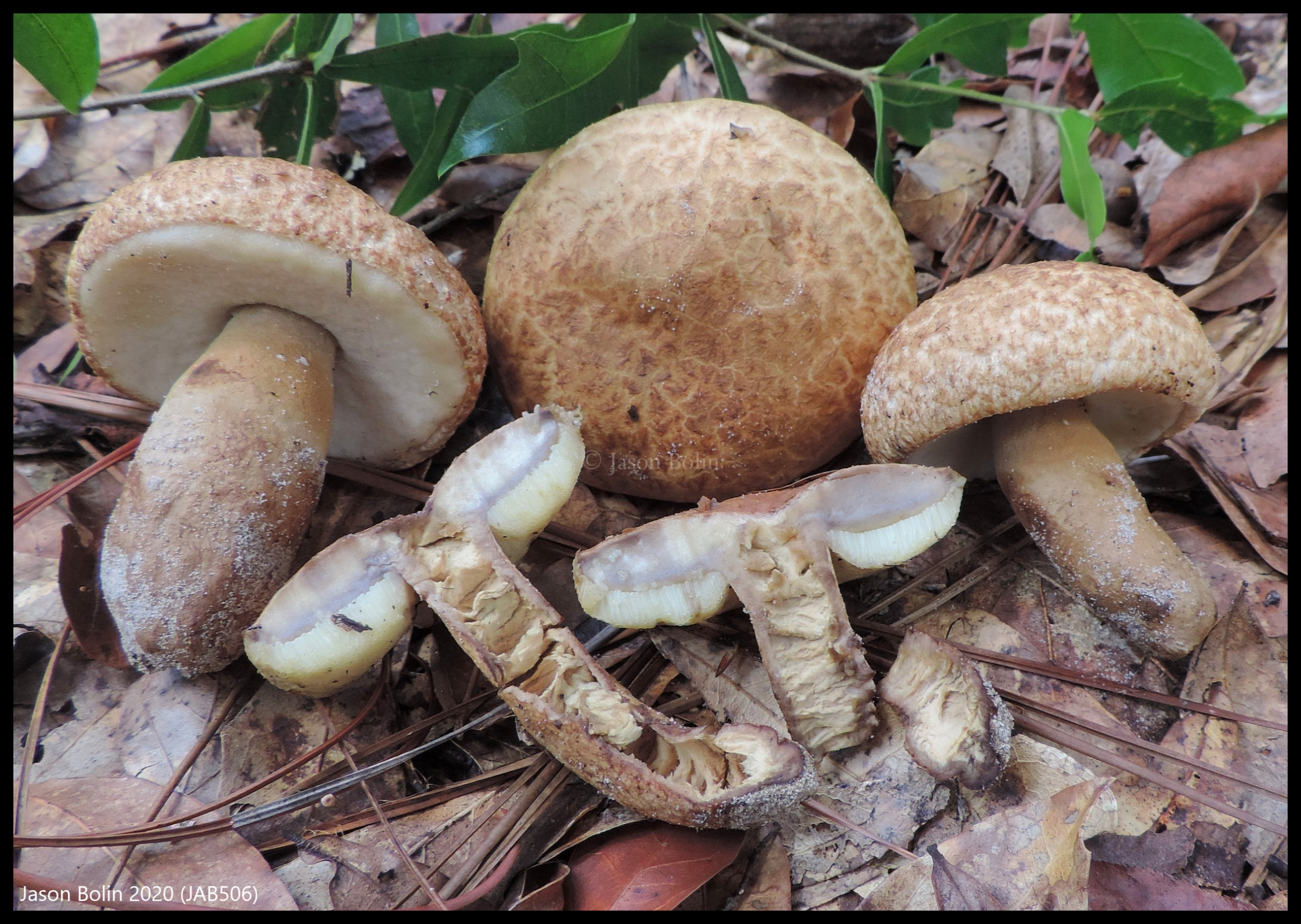

Scientific classification
- Domain: Eukaryota
- Kingdom: Fungi
- Division: Basidiomycota
- Class: Agaricomycetes
- Order: Boletales
- Family: Gyroporaceae
- Genus: Gyroporus
- Species: G. phaeocyanescens

Binomial name
- Gyroporus phaeocyanescens Singer & M.H.Ivory (1983)

= Gyroporus phaeocyanescens =

Species of fungus

Gyroporus phaeocyanescens is a species of bolete fungus in the family Gyroporaceae. It was described as new to science in 1983 from collections made in Belize.

== See also ==
- List of North American boletes
