= Gyroporus brunneofloccosus =

Scientific classification
- Domain: Eukaryota
- Kingdom: Fungi
- Division: Basidiomycota
- Class: Agaricomycetes
- Order: Boletales
- Family: Gyroporaceae
- Genus: Gyroporus
- Species: G. brunneofloccosus

Binomial name
- Gyroporus brunneofloccosus T.H.Li, W.Q.Deng & B.Song (2003)

Species of fungus

Gyroporus brunneofloccosus is a species of bolete fungus in the family Gyroporaceae. Described as new to science in 2003, it is found in China.
