= Phauloppia =

Scientific classification
- Kingdom: Animalia
- Phylum: Arthropoda
- Subphylum: Chelicerata
- Class: Arachnida
- Order: Oribatida
- Family: Oribatulidae
- Genus: Phauloppia; Berlese, 1908

Genus of mites

Phauloppia is a genus of mites belonging to the family Oribatulidae.

The species of this genus are found in Europe and Northern America.

== Species ==
Species:

- Eporibatula gessneri Sellnick, 1928
- Eporibatula longiporosa Perez-I
- Eporibatula nodifer Mihelcic, 1956
