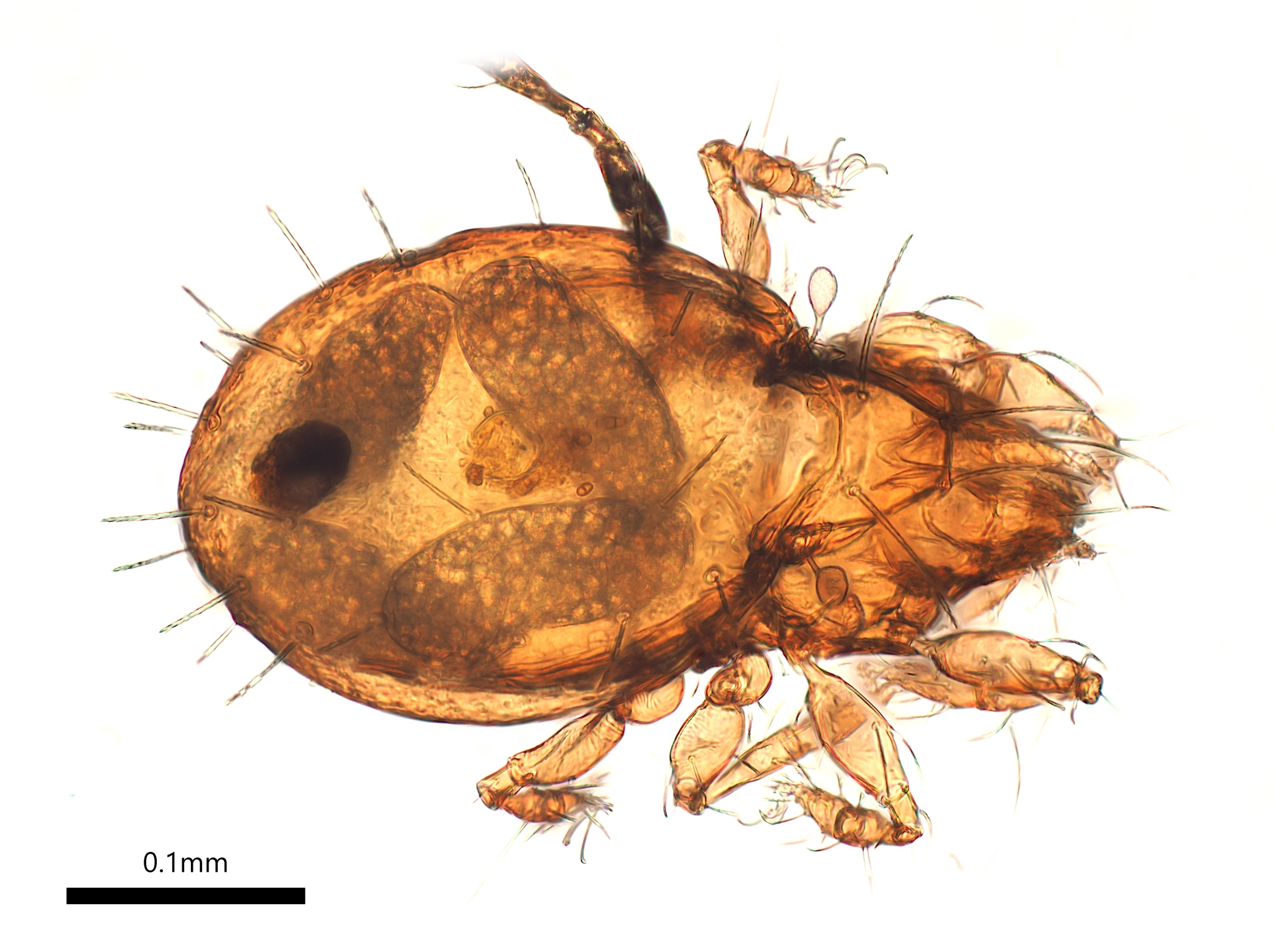
- Zygoribatula sp.

Scientific classification
- Kingdom: Animalia
- Phylum: Arthropoda
- Subphylum: Chelicerata
- Class: Arachnida
- Order: Oribatida
- Superfamily: Oripodoidea
- Family: Oribatulidae; Thor, 1929

= Oribatulidae =

Oribatulidae Temporal range: Palaeogene–present

Family of mites

Oribatulidae is a family of mites and ticks in the order Sarcoptiformes. There are about 19 genera and at least 200 described species in Oribatulidae.

== Genera ==
- Capilloppia Balogh & Mahunka, 1966
- Crassoribatula Hammer, 1967
- Diphauloppia J. & P. Balogh, 1984
- Grandjeania Balogh, 1963
- Jornadia Wallwork & Weems, 1984
- Lucoppia Berlese, 1908
- Lunoribatula Mahunka, 1982
- Megatrichobates Grobler, 2000
- Neolucoppia Tseng, 1984
- Oribatula Berlese, 1896 (See inc. Zygoribatula)
- Ovobates Mahunka, 1994
- Paraphauloppia Hammer, 1967
- Phauloppia Berlese, 1908
- Phauloppiella Subías, 1977
- Reticuloppia Balogh & Mahunka, 1966
- Sellnickia Oudemans, 1927
- Spinoppia Higgins & Woolley, 1966
- Subphauloppia Hammer, 1967
