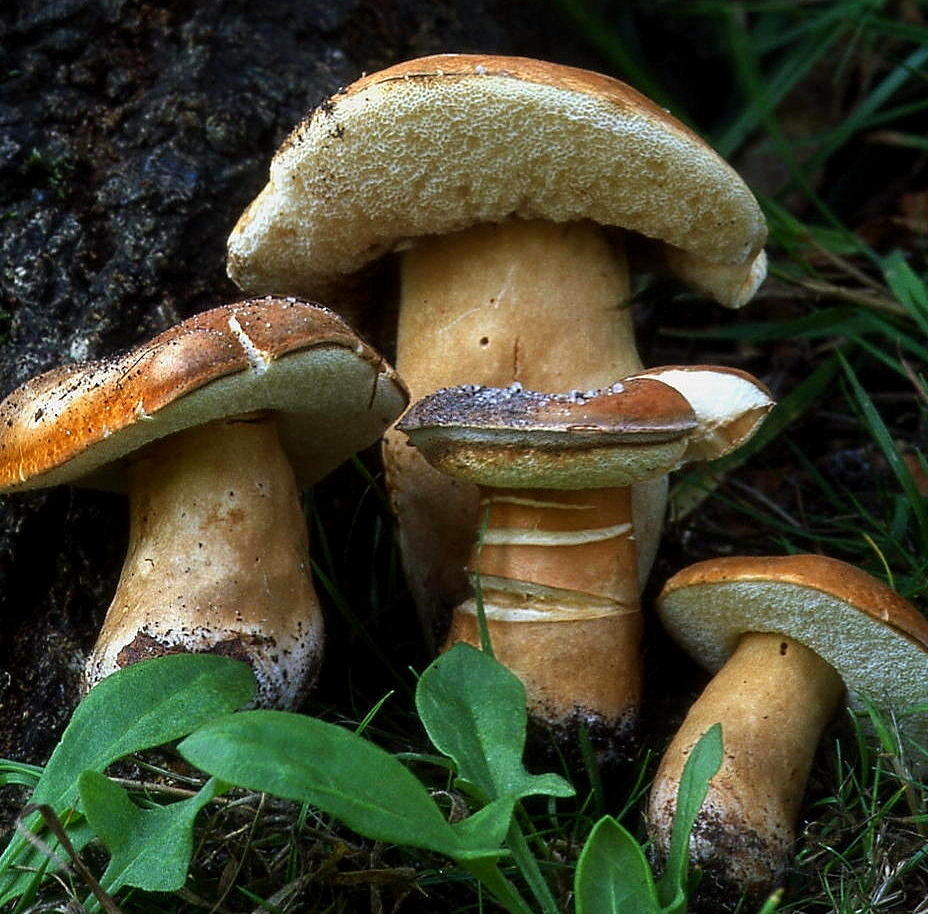
- Gyroporus castaneus

Scientific classification
- Kingdom: Fungi
- Division: Basidiomycota
- Class: Agaricomycetes
- Order: Boletales
- Family: Gyroporaceae (Singer) Manfr.Binder & Bresinsky (2002)
- Genus: Gyroporus; Quél. (1886)

Type species
- Gyroporus cyanescens (Bull.) Quél. (1886)

Species
- See Text

Synonyms
- Suillus P.Karst. Coelopus Bataille (1908); Leucobolites Beck (1923); Leucoconius Beck (1923)

= Gyroporus =

Genus of fungi

The Gyroporaceae are a family of fungi in the order Boletales. The family is monogeneric, containing the single genus Gyroporus, which, according to a 2008 estimate, contains ten widely distributed species, though a more recent study suggested the species-level diversity to be far higher. As of January 2026, according to Index Fungorum and Mycobank databases, the genus had 46 species.

== Species ==
As of January 2026, Index Fungorum lists the following species in Gyroporus:

Image	Name	Taxon Author	Year
	Gyroporus aculifer	(Corner) E. Horak	2011
	Gyroporus alboluteus	Ming Zhang & T.H. Li	2022
	Gyroporus alpinus	Yan C. Li, C. Huang & Zhu L. Yang	2021
	Gyroporus atrocyanescens	Ming Zhang & T.H. Li	2022
	Gyroporus australiensis	Davoodian, N.A. Fechner & Halling	2018
	Gyroporus austrobrasiliensis	A.C. Magnago & R.M. Silveira	2018
	Gyroporus biporus	Murrill	1945
	Gyroporus borealis	Davoodian, O. Asher, Sturgeon, Ammirati & Delaney	2020
	Gyroporus brunneofloccosus	T.H. Li, W.Q. Deng & B. Song	2003
	Gyroporus brunnescens	Davoodian, N.A. Fechner & Halling	2018
	Gyroporus castaneus	(Bull.) Quél.	1886
	Gyroporus cyanescens	(Bull.) Quél.	1886
	Gyroporus earlei	Murrill	1921
	Gyroporus flavocyanescens	Yan C. Li, C. Huang & Zhu L. Yang	2021
	Gyroporus fumosiceps	Murrill	1943
	Gyroporus furvescens	Davoodian & Halling	2018
	Gyroporus heterosporus	Heinem. & Rammeloo	1951
	Gyroporus longicystidiatus	Nagas. & Hongo	2001
	Gyroporus madagascariensis	Buyck, O. Asher & Davoodian	2020
	Gyroporus malesicus	Corner	1972
	Gyroporus mcnabbii	Davoodian, Bougher & Halling	2018
	Gyroporus memnonius	N.K. Zeng, H.J. Xie & M.S. Su	2022
	Gyroporus microsporus	(Singer & Grinling) Heinem. & Rammeloo	1979
	Gyroporus naranjus	Davoodian, Bougher, Fechner & Halling	2019
	Gyroporus occidentalis	Davoodian, Bougher & Halling	2019
	Gyroporus pallidus	Ming Zhang & T.H. Li	2022
	Gyroporus paralongicystidiatus	Davoodian	2018
	Gyroporus paramjitii	K. Das, D. Chakraborty & Vizzini	2017
	Gyroporus phaeocyanescens	Singer & M.H. Ivory	1983
	Gyroporus porphyreus	N.K. Zeng, H.J. Xie & Zhi Q. Liang	2022
	Gyroporus pseudocyanescens	G. Moreno, Carlavilla, Heykoop, Manjón & Vizzini	2017
	Gyroporus pseudolacteus	G. Moreno, Carlavilla, Heykoop, Manjón & Vizzini	2016
	Gyroporus pseudolongicystidiatus	Ming Zhang, D.C. Xie & T.H. Li	2022
	Gyroporus pseudomicrosporus	M. Zang	1986
	Gyroporus punctatus	Lj.N. Vassiljeva	1950
	Gyroporus purpurinus	Singer ex Davoodian & Halling	2013
	Gyroporus robinsonii	Davoodian	2019
	Gyroporus roseialbus	Murrill	1938
	Gyroporus setigerus	(Corner) E. Horak	2011
	Gyroporus smithii	Davoodian	2020
	Gyroporus subalbellus	Murrill	1910
	Gyroporus subcaerulescens	Ming Zhang & T.H. Li	2022
	Gyroporus subglobosus	N.K. Zeng, H.J. Xie, L.P. Tang & M. Mu	2022
	Gyroporus swaticus	Sana & M. Kiran	2025
	Gyroporus tuberculatosporus	M. Zang	1996
	Gyroporus violaceotinctus	(Watling) Blanco-Dios	2018

Although Index Fungorum lists Gyroporus ammophilus as a synonym for Gyroporus castaneus, Mycobank lists Gyroporus ammophilus as a separate species.
