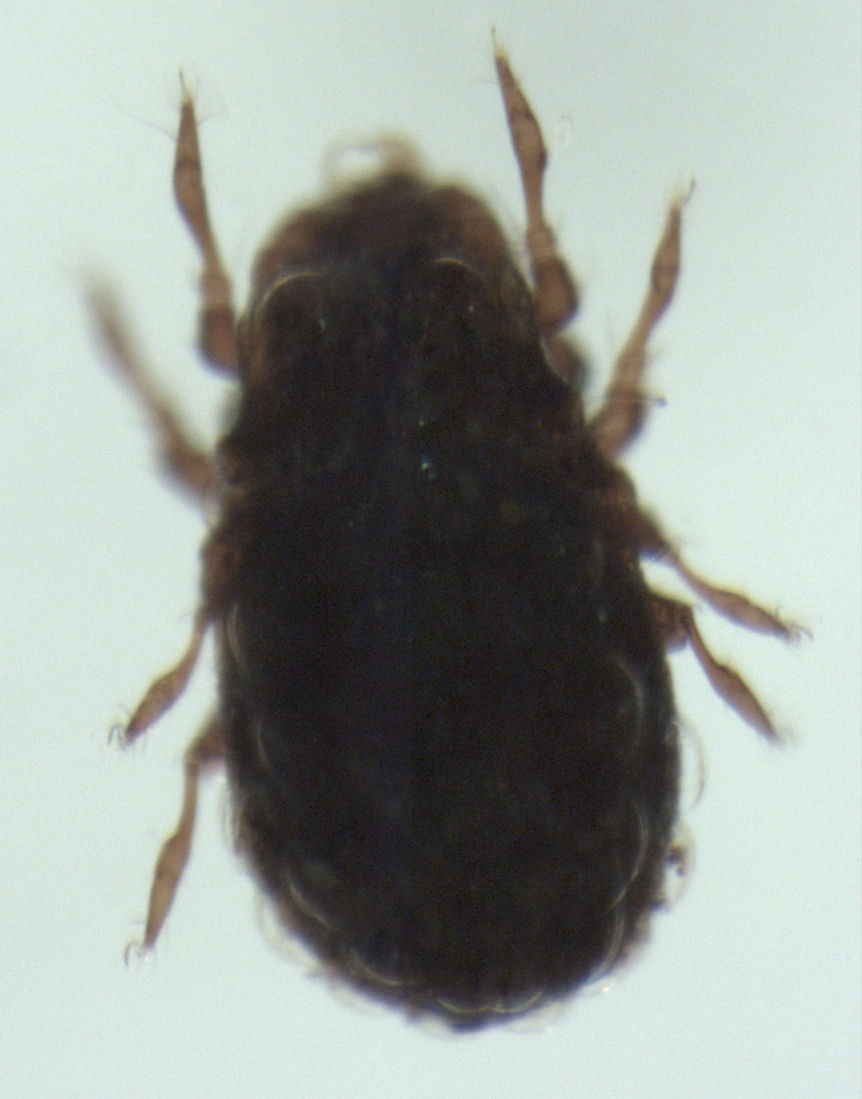

Scientific classification
- Kingdom: Animalia
- Phylum: Arthropoda
- Subphylum: Chelicerata
- Class: Arachnida
- Order: Oribatida
- Superfamily: Carabodoidea
- Family: Carabodidae; Koch, 1837

= Carabodidae =

Carabodidae Temporal range: Palaeogene–present

Family of mites

Carabodidae is a family of oribatids in the order Oribatida. There are at least 20 genera and 300 described species in Carabodidae.

== Genera ==
- Apotomocepheus Aoki, 1965
- Archegocepheus Aoki, 1965
- Austrocarabodes Hammer, 1966
- Bathocepheus Aoki, 1978
- Bunabodes Fujikawa, 2004
- Carabodes Koch, 1835
- Cavernocarabodes Mahunka, 1974
- Congocepheus Balogh, 1958
- Cubabodes Balogh & Mahunka, 1974
- Diplobodes Aoki, 1958
- Gibbicepheus Balogh, 1958
- Gymnobodes Balogh, 1965
- Hardybodes Balogh, 1970
- Machadocepheus Balogh, 1958
- Malgasodes Mahunka, 2000
- Meriocepheus Aoki, 1973
- Odontocepheus Berlese, 1913
- Pasocepheus Aoki, 1976
- Pseudocarabodes Mahunka, 1991
- Sagittabodes J. & P. Balogh, 1992
- Singabodes Mahunka, 1998
- Spathulocepheus Balogh & Mahunka, 1969
- Tansocepheus Mahunka, 1983
- Tectocarabodes Mahunka, 1988
- Trichocarabodes Balogh, 1961
- Tuberocepheus Balogh & Mahunka, 1969
- Yoshiobodes Mahunka, 1986
