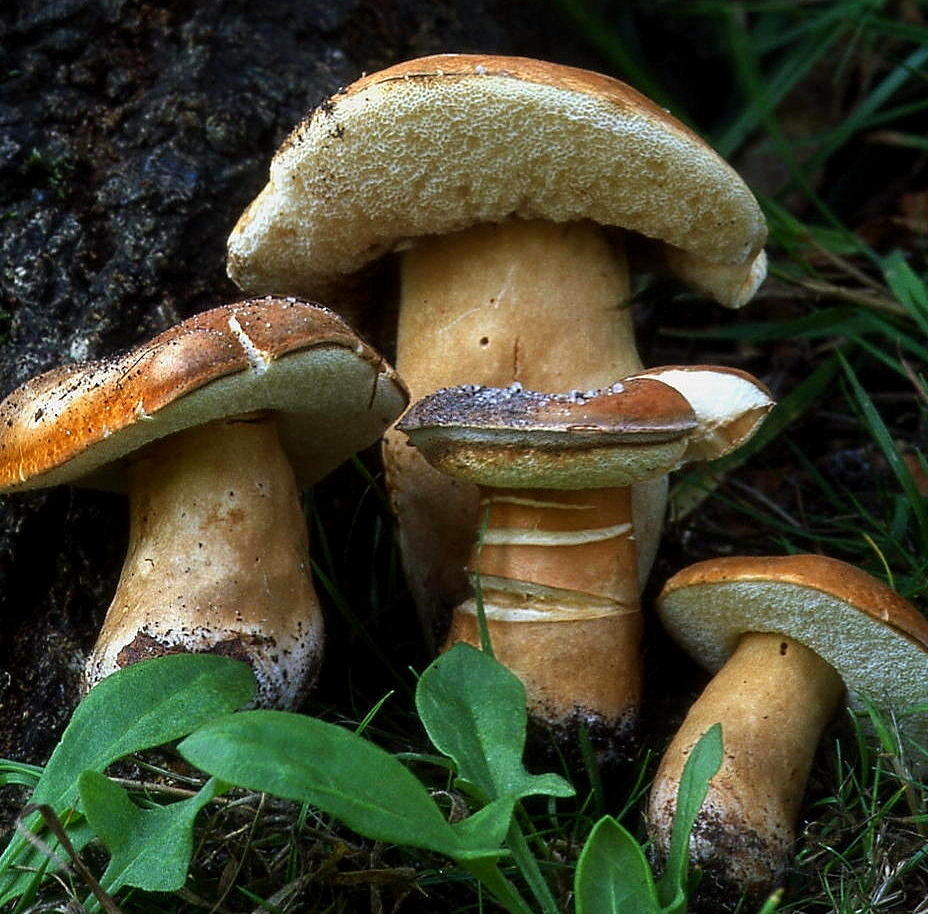

Scientific classification
- Kingdom: Fungi
- Division: Basidiomycota
- Class: Agaricomycetes
- Order: Boletales
- Family: Gyroporaceae
- Genus: Gyroporus
- Species: G. castaneus

Binomial name
- Gyroporus castaneus (Bull.) Quél. (1886)

Synonyms
- Boletus castaneus Bull. (1787); Suillus castaneus (Bull.) P.Karst. (1882); Leucobolites castaneus (Bull.) Beck (1923)

= Gyroporus castaneus =

Gyroporus castaneus
- Mycological characteristics
- Pores on hymenium
- Cap is convex or flat
- Stipe is bare
- Spore print is yellow
- Ecology is mycorrhizal
- Edibility is choice but not recommended

Gyroporus castaneus, commonly known as the chestnut bolete, is a small, white-pored mushroom in the Gyroporaceae of order Boletales. It has a brown cap, and is usually found with oak trees. It differs from the true boletes in that the spores are a pale straw colour.

== Taxonomy ==
The species was described initially by the French mycologist Jean Baptiste François Pierre Bulliard (1742–1792). Formerly a member of the family Paxillaceae, research now places this mushroom in Gyroporaceae. Gyroporus means 'having round pores', and castaneus is a reference to the chestnut colouration.

== Description ==
The cap is from 3 to 10 cm in diameter, and pale to rusty brown in colour, which becomes darker with age. The stem is a similar colour, although it may be lighter at the apex. If the stem is cut vertically, it is usual to find several cavities of differing sizes inside. Both the cap and the stem have a tendency to crack or split in dry periods, or with age. The pores are small and white, yellowing with age, and are not attached to the stem. They darken slightly when pressed. The tubes are also whitish, and the spore print is pale yellow to straw. The flesh is firm, and does not change colour on cutting.

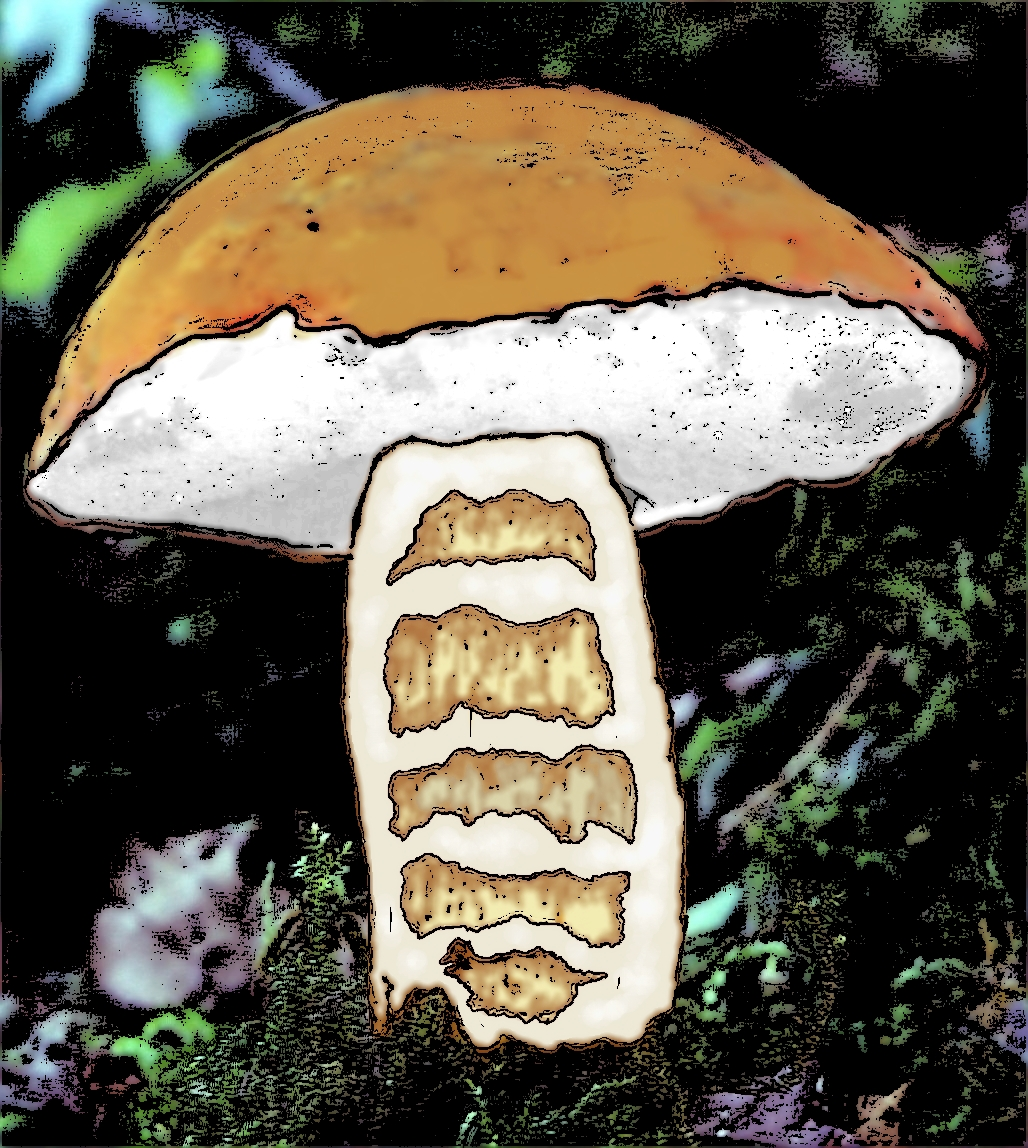
Typical stem cavities

== Distribution and habitat ==
The mushroom is found occasionally in Britain and throughout continental Europe, as well as eastern North America, but it is rare in western North America. It grows in small groups, or singly, in an ectomycorrhizal relationship with oaks (Quercus). It prefers acid and sandy soils, and fruits from summer to autumn. In New Zealand, it is found in association with Leptospermum. In Asia, it has been recorded from Taiwan.

Gyroporus castaneus has been included in the Moscow Oblast's and the Russian Federation's Red Book and several other countries' Red Lists, including those of Norway and Montenegro.

== Edibility ==
Gyroporus castaneus is edible and highly regarded by most authors. In 1987, Marcel Bon regarded it as suspect. There is a nearly identical but poisonous species known as Gyroporus ammophilus, it is sometimes considered a variety of Gyroporus castaneus.

== See also ==
- List of North American boletes
