= Punctelia ulophylla =

Scientific classification
- Domain: Eukaryota
- Kingdom: Fungi
- Division: Ascomycota
- Class: Lecanoromycetes
- Order: Lecanorales
- Family: Parmeliaceae
- Genus: Punctelia
- Species: P. ulophylla

Binomial name
- Punctelia ulophylla (Ach.) Herk & Aptroot (2000)

Synonyms
- Parmelia caperata var. ulophylla Ach. (1810); Platysma sepincola subsp. ulophylla (Ach.) Nyl. (1861); Parmelia borreri var. ulophylla (Ach.) Nyl. (1872); Parmelia ulophylla F.Wilson (1893); Parmelia dubia var. ulophylla (Ach.) Harm. (1897); Imbricaria borreri var. ulophylla (Ach.) Jatta (1902)

Species of lichen

Punctelia ulophylla is a species of foliose lichen in the family Parmeliaceae. It is found in Europe, where it grows on the bark of a variety of trees.

== Taxonomy ==
The lichen was first formally described in 1810 as a variety of Parmelia caperata by Swedish lichenologist Erik Acharius. The type specimens were collected in Switzerland by Swiss botanist Johann Christoph Schleicher. After its initial publication, the taxon name was seldom used by others and generally neglected, possibly a consequence of the proliferation of varieties and forms that were described in the genus Parmelia.

During the course of a 1997 study on a then-recent population increase in Punctelia borreri, the authors observed many instances of two closely related species of Punctelia, both with soredia and containing lecanoric acid. These two species, which were often found side by side on the same tree, occurred in several western European countries–Belgium, France, Germany, Luxembourg, the Netherlands, and Switzerland. Both keyed out to Punctelia subrudecta, even though it was apparent they were different, not only in the colour of the thallus (a distinction that was obvious especially when wet), but in other subtle morphological characteristics as well. In an attempt to accurately place historical names to these taxa, the authors examined type material of several Punctelia taxa. One of the two species turned out to be identical to the type of Punctelia subrudecta. The other species was identical with the type of Parmelia caperata var. ulophylla, published by Acharius around 200 years before. Van Herk and Aptroot proposed the new combination Punctelia ulophylla, thus resurrecting the old name. Preliminary molecular phylogenetic analyses of genus Punctelia confirmed the species status of Punctelia ulophylla.

== Description ==
The thallus of Punctelia ulophylla is closely attached to its substrate, typically measuring 3–5 cm (1.2–2.0 in) in diameter–although specimens up to 10 cm (4 in) have been recorded. Its colour is pale greenish-grey, transitioning to pale brownish-grey near the margins. The thallus underside is whitish-cream to pale brown. The outer margins of the lichens are pruinose.

== Habitat and distribution ==
Strictly a corticolous species, Punctelia ulophylla has been recorded on the bark of a wide variety of plants, including: maple, quince, ash, larch, poplar, linden, oak, willow and elder. It occurs in Europe. It was recorded from Norway in 2007.
