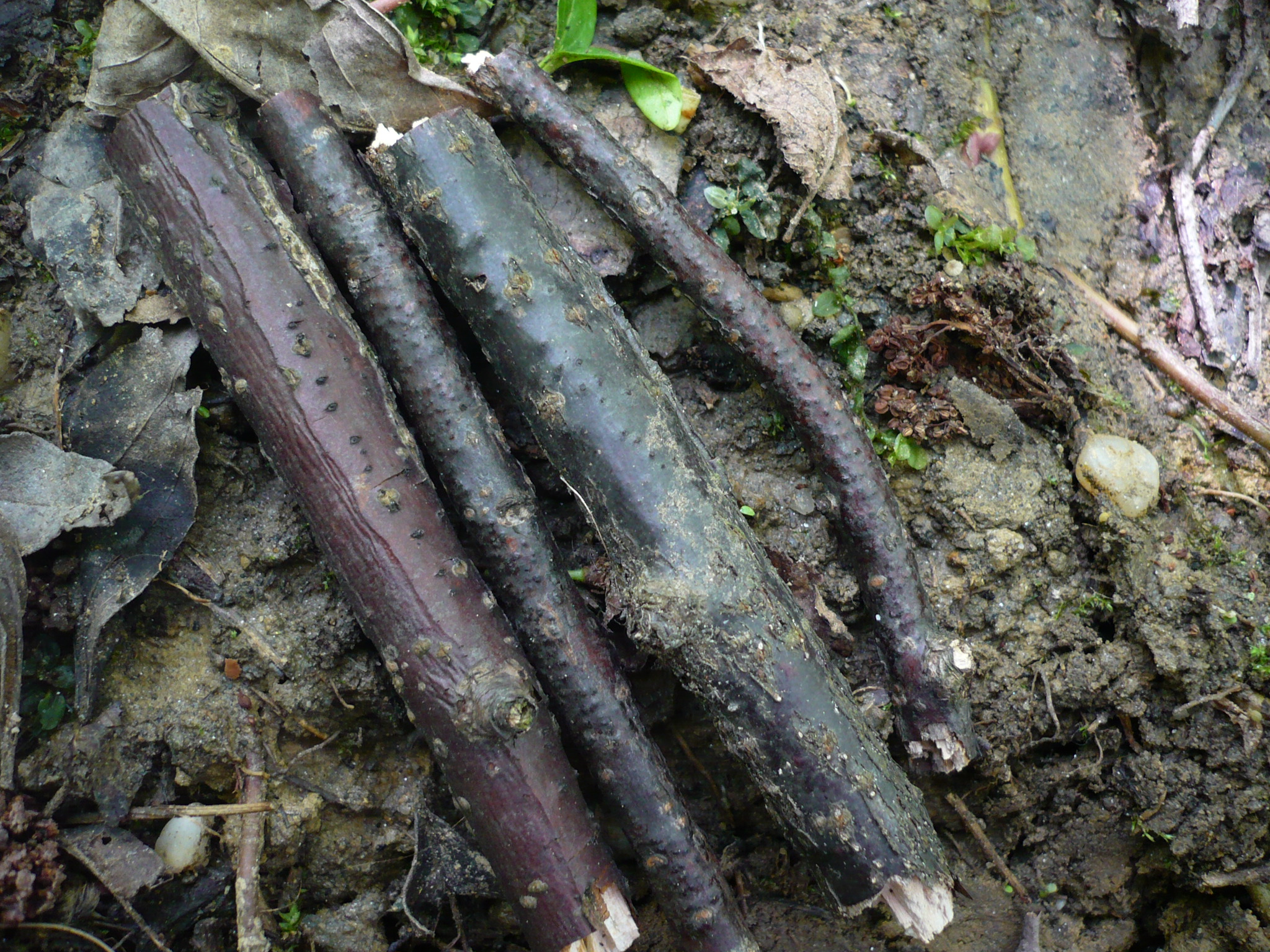
- Pleurostoma vibratilis on Prunus padus twigs

Scientific classification
- Kingdom: Fungi
- Division: Ascomycota
- Class: Sordariomycetes
- Subclass: Diaporthomycetidae
- Order: Calosphaeriales; M.E. Barr 1983

Families
- Calosphaeriaceae; Pleurostomataceae

= Calosphaeriales =

Order of fungi

The Calosphaeriales are an order of fungi within the class Sordariomycetes containing 2 families. They are saprophytes and have small fruiting bodies.

== Subdivision ==
- Family Calosphaeriaceae
  - Calosphaeria
  - Calosphaeriophora
  - Jattaea
  - Kacosphaeria
  - Pachytrype
  - Phaeocrella
  - Phragmocalosphaeria
  - Togniniella
  - Wegelina
- Family Pleurostomataceae
  - Pleurostoma
  - Pleurostomophora
- incertae sedis
  - Conidiotheca
  - Sulcatistroma
