= Punctelia transtasmanica =

Scientific classification
- Domain: Eukaryota
- Kingdom: Fungi
- Division: Ascomycota
- Class: Lecanoromycetes
- Order: Lecanorales
- Family: Parmeliaceae
- Genus: Punctelia
- Species: P. transtasmanica

Binomial name
- Punctelia transtasmanica Elix & Kantvilas (2005)

Species of lichen

Punctelia transtasmanica is a species of foliose lichen in the family Parmeliaceae. It is found in Australasia.

== Taxonomy ==
The lichen was described as a new species in 2005 by Australian lichenologists John Alan Elix and Gintaras Kantvilas. The type was collected near the summit of South Sister in Tasmania, at an altitude of 800 m (2,600 ft). There it was found on Tasmanian pepperberry growing in wet scrub. The specific epithet refers to "the occurrence of this species along the eastern and western shores of the Tasman Sea". The lichen also occurs in Flinders Island (northeast of Tasmania), where it is locally common, and the North Island of New Zealand. Punctelia transtasmanica resembles P. borreri, and had historically been confused with that species. They can be distinguished by differences in chemical reactions to lichen spot tests.

== Description ==
The lichen has a foliose, pale-grey to blue-grey to green-grey thallus measuring 5–7 cm (2.0–2.8 in) wide, with a fairly loose attachment to its substrate. The thallus comprises crowded lobes, sometimes overlapping, each measuring 1–4 mm. The thallus surface is more or less smooth with wrinkles near the centre, and has soredia and pseudocyphellae. The undersurface of the thallus is wrinkled, brownish black to black in colour, with many simple (unbranched) brown to black rhizines. The results of standard lichen spot tests are cortex K+ (yellow); medulla K−, C+ (red), KC+ (red), P−. Punctelia transtasmanica contains the secondary chemicals atranorin, chloroatranorin (both minor), lecanoric acid (major), and gyrophoric acid (trace amounts).
