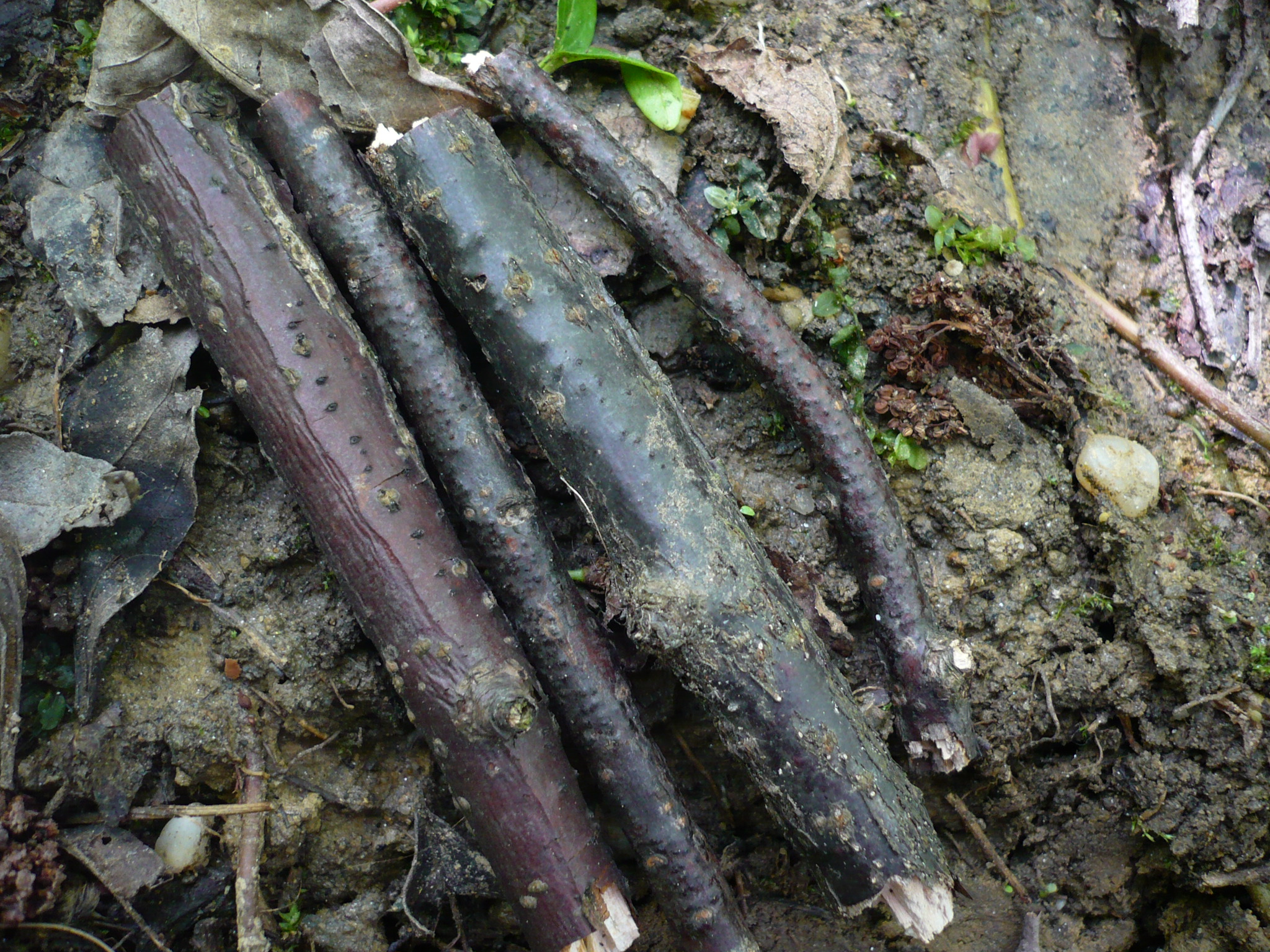

Scientific classification
- Kingdom: Fungi
- Division: Ascomycota
- Class: Sordariomycetes
- Order: Calosphaeriales
- Family: Pleurostomataceae
- Genus: Pleurostoma; Tul. & C. Tul. 1863

Species
- Pleurostoma candollei Pleurostoma ootheca

= Pleurostoma =

Genus of fungi

Pleurostoma is a genus of fungi in the family Pleurostomataceae containing 2 species.
