= Sulcatistroma =

Scientific classification
- Kingdom: Fungi
- Division: Ascomycota
- Class: Sordariomycetes
- Order: Calosphaeriales
- Genus: Sulcatistroma; A.W. Ramaley 2005
- Species: S. nolinae

Binomial name
- Sulcatistroma nolinae A.W. Ramaley 2005

Genus of fungi

Sulcatistroma is a monotypic genus of fungi. It contains the sole species Sulcatistroma nolinae. The position of this genus within the order Calosphaeriales is unknown.
