= William Borrer =

British botanist, lichenologist and mycologist (1781–1862)

William Borrer FRS; FLS;CMWS
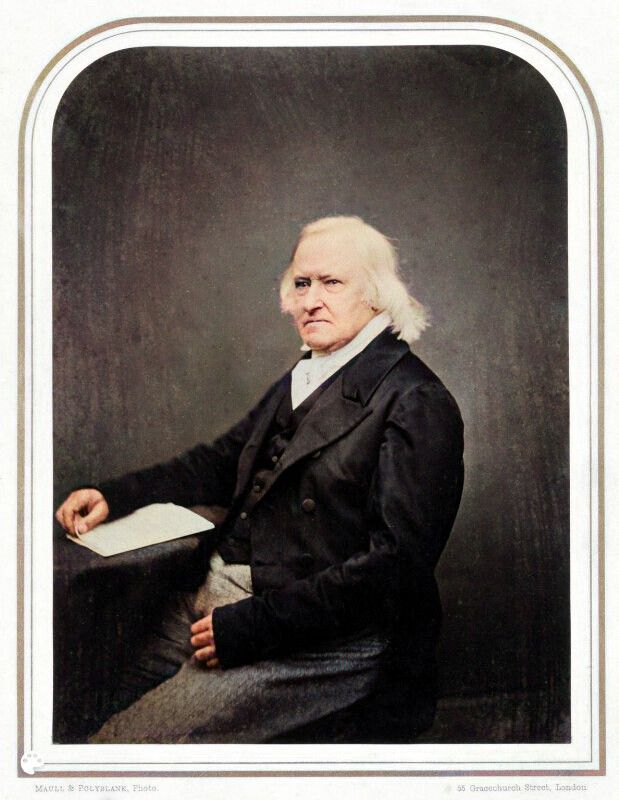
- Portrait photograph by Maull and Polyblank, c. 1855
- Born: 13 June 1781
- Died: 10 January 1862 (aged 80); Barrow Hill, Henfield
- Resting place: St Peter's Churchyard, Henfield, West Sussex
- Known for: Plant identification skill
- Spouse: Elizabeth Hall
- Children: 13
- Scientific career
- Fields: Botany

William Borrer FRS (Henfield, Sussex, 13 June 1781 – 10 January 1862) was an English botanist noted for his extensive and accurate knowledge of the plants of the British Islands.

He travelled extensively around Britain to see and collect plants and lichens, and also once crossed the English Channel to visit Normandy. He was accompanied on some of his travels by William Jackson Hooker and by Charles Cardale Babington. Borrer was particularly interested in lichens, willows, roses and succulents although had a very broad knowledge of plants. He was particularly good at recording plant identifications but often omitted the date and location where the plant was collected. He was also frequently consulted about identifications. He attempted to grow many plant species in his garden so that he could distinguish key identification characteristics without concerns that differences were caused by different habitats. In W. A. Clarke's First Records of British Flowering Plants published in 1897, Borrer was credited as the first to identify 21 species of flowering plants at locations from Cornwall to Caithness. These included Isnardia palustris at Buxted in 1827 and the grass Leersia oryzoides at Henfield Levels in 1844 and several willows. He also identified several marine algae and lichens.

He met and corresponded with other botanists in the UK and abroad including Joseph Banks, Dawson Turner, Hewett Cottrell Watson and Joseph Hooker and exchanged plant specimens with them. Borrer was elected a Fellow of the Linnean Society in 1805 as well Fellow of the Royal Society in 1835. He was also a member of the Wernerian Natural History Society based in Edinburgh. Borrer was one of those who proposed William Hooker for fellowship of the Linnean Society in 1806.

== Publications ==
Borrer published very little in his own name but contributed information to several important works on British botany during the early 1800s that acknowledged his assistance. This included the Sussex flora in Turner and Dillwyn's Botanist's Guide through England and Wales published in 1805. In 1813 he began to work with Dawson Turner on British lichens and the Lichenographia Britannica was finally published in 1839. He contributed to numerous other publications such as descriptions of lichens, Salix, Rosa, and Rubus to the supplement to English Botany published in 1830.

Borrer's most sustained published work on lichens was through William Jackson Hooker's Supplement to the English Botany, which was issued in parts between 1829 and 1866. Across its five volumes the Supplement included 57 lichen accounts, and Borrer described 26 of these as new species. Later review has shown that one of his novelties, Verrucaria hookeri (now Dacampia hookeri), is a lichenicolous species (a fungus growing on lichens), while the only other "new lichen" in the work, Strigula babingtonii (described by Miles Joseph Berkeley, now named Dennisiella babingtonii), is now treated as a non-lichenized ascomycete. The same study attempted to trace the original material used for these descriptions and illustrations, and located all but one of the type specimens. Most are held either in Borrer's herbarium at Kew (K-Borrer) or in the Natural History Museum, London, including specimens kept alongside the original published drawings from the Sowerby collection; the type of Verrucaria psoromoides was the only one that could not be found.

His extensive annotated herbarium is conserved at the Royal Botanic Gardens, Kew and his correspondence is held in several archives, including Cambridge University Library.

Over living 6600 specimens were recorded in his garden including exotic plants and trees. Some were transferred to Kew Gardens after his death. The collection included 81 different willow species.

He named the wild leek, Allium babingtonii Borrer after his friend Babington.

== Personal life ==
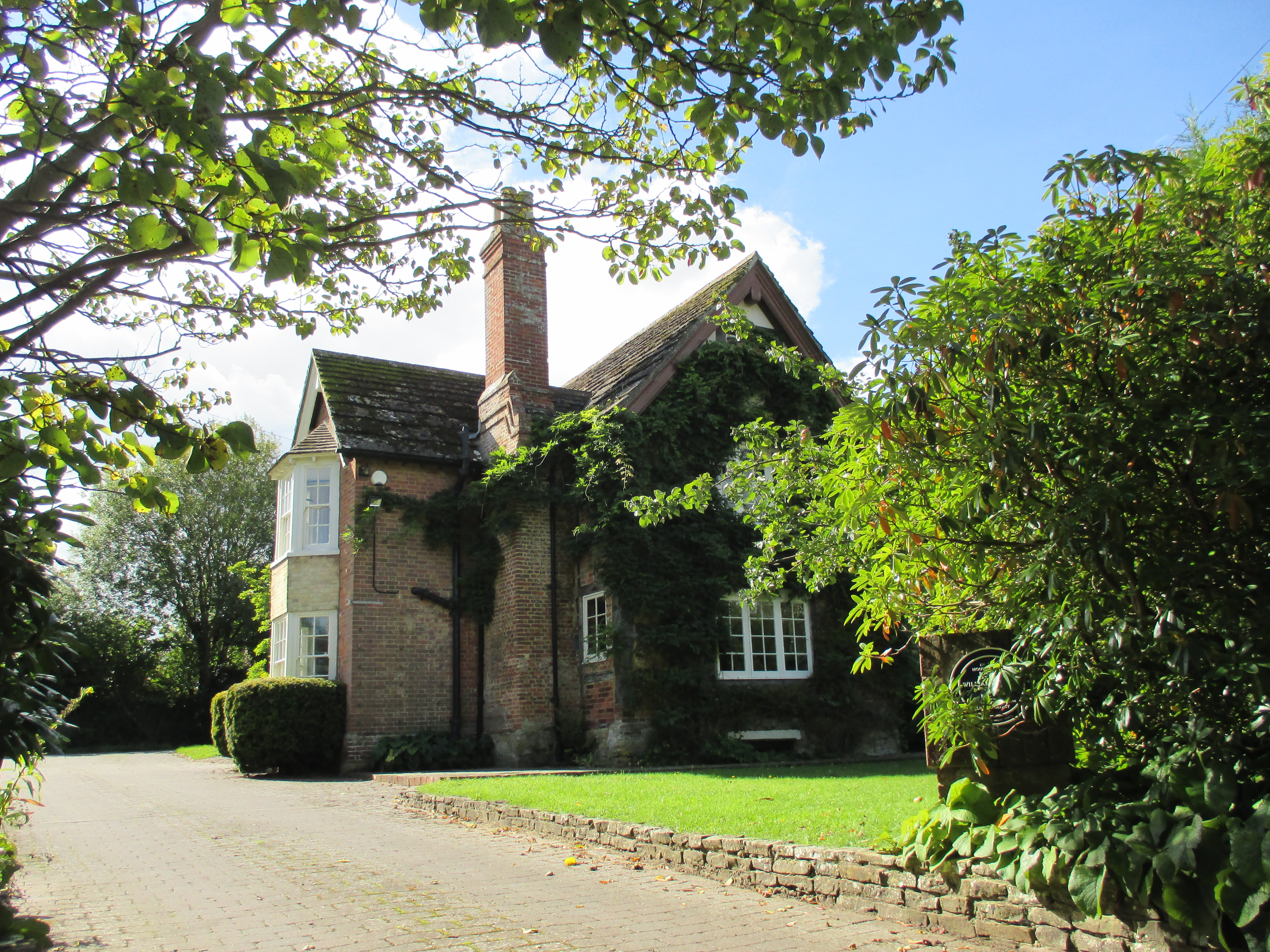
Potwell, Borrer's birthplace in Henfield, West Sussex

Borrer was born in Henfield, Sussex, on 13 June 1781. His parents were landowners and farmers who supplied the army. He was educated at private schools and by tutors. He was interested in plants from a young age. After he inherited family wealth, he could devote himself to plants.

Borrer was a patron of the sciences and supported his local church financially. He also promoted education of the poor through building schools on his land. He was also a magistrate.

He married Elizabeth Hall in 1810 and they had 13 children together. Five died in childhood. He died at his residence at Barrow-hill, Sussex on 10 January 1862.

== Recognition ==
In 1996, a blue plaque commemorating Borrer was unveiled at Potwell in Henfield, where he was born.

Several plant species were named after him, including Borrer's salt marsh grass, Glyceria borreri (Bab.) Bab. (later given the new systematic name Puccinellia fasciculata (Torr.) Bicknell), the fern Dryopteris borreri Newm., the seaweed Callithamnion borreri (currently considered a synonym of Pleonosporium borreri (Smith) Nägeli), the desmid Didymoprium borreri (Ralfs) Ralfs, the scentless briar Rosa borreri Woods, and the hybrid woodrush Luzula x borreri Bromf. ex Bab (currently considered to be Luzula forsteri x pilosa). The lichen Punctelia borreri was named in his honour, as was the lichen genus Borrera (now known as Teloschistes).

== See also ==
- Category:Taxa named by William Borrer

== Bibliography ==
- Appletons' annual cyclopaedia and register of important events of the year: 1862. New York: D. Appleton & Company. 1863. p. 683.
- Stephen, Leslie, ed. (1886). "Borrer, William" . Dictionary of National Biography. Vol. 5. London: Smith, Elder & Co.
