= Kacosphaeria =

Scientific classification
- Kingdom: Fungi
- Division: Ascomycota
- Class: Sordariomycetes
- Order: Calosphaeriales
- Family: Calosphaeriaceae
- Genus: Kacosphaeria; Speg. 1887
- Species: K. antarctica

Binomial name
- Kacosphaeria antarctica Speg. 1888

Genus of fungi

Kacosphaeria is a monotypic genus of fungi in the family Calosphaeriaceae. It contains the sole species Kacosphaeria antarctica
