= Antonio Jatta =

Italian politician and lichenologist

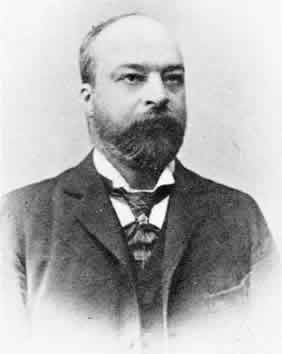
- Born: 25 June 1852; Ruvo di Puglia
- Died: 4 August 1912 (aged 60); Ruvo di Puglia
- Scientific career
- Fields: Politics; Lichenology
- Author abbrev. (botany): Jatta

Antonio Jatta (25 June 1852 – 4 August 1912) was an Italian politician and lichenologist. After completing his secondary studies at the Classical Lyceum Umberto I in Naples, at the age of 22 he graduated with honours in natural history at the University of Naples and in agriculture at the Royal Higher School of Agriculture in Portici. Already at that time he distributed an exsiccata-like work under the title Lichenes Italiae Meridionalis exsiccati. He was a wealthy landowner who published Flora Italica Cryptogama in several volumes from 1900 to 1909. Jatta identified the lichens that were given in the 1915 list of the lichens of the Maltese Islands, compiled by the botanists Carlo Pietro Stefano Sommier and Alfredo Caruana Gatto. A 1962 publication by William Culberson noted that most of his subgeneric names from the Flora Italica Cryptogama had not been included in Alexander Zahlbruckner's influential 10-volume work Catalog Lichenum Universalis (1922–1940), nor in Elke Mackenzie's (then known as Ivan Lamb) 1963 follow-up work Index Nominum Lichenum. Culberson catalogued 467 of Jatta's names to avoid the future publication of "superfluous or otherwise illegitimate names".

Jatta was a member of the Italian Botanical Society, the Société botanique de France, the Cryptogamological Society of Milan, the Geological Society of Rome, and the Society of Natural and Mathematical Sciences of Naples.

In 1900, botanist Augusto Napoleone Berlese published Jattaea, a genus of fungi in the family Calosphaeriaceae and named in honour of Jatta.

== See also ==
- Category:Taxa named by Antonio Jatta
