= Pachytrype =

Scientific classification
- Kingdom: Fungi
- Division: Ascomycota
- Class: Sordariomycetes
- Order: Calosphaeriales
- Family: Calosphaeriaceae
- Genus: Pachytrype; Berl. ex M.E. Barr, J.D. Rogers & Y.M. Ju 1993

Species
- Pachytrype graphidioides Pachytrype princeps Pachytrype rimosa

Genus of fungi

Pachytrype is a genus of fungi in the family Calosphaeriaceae containing 3 species.
