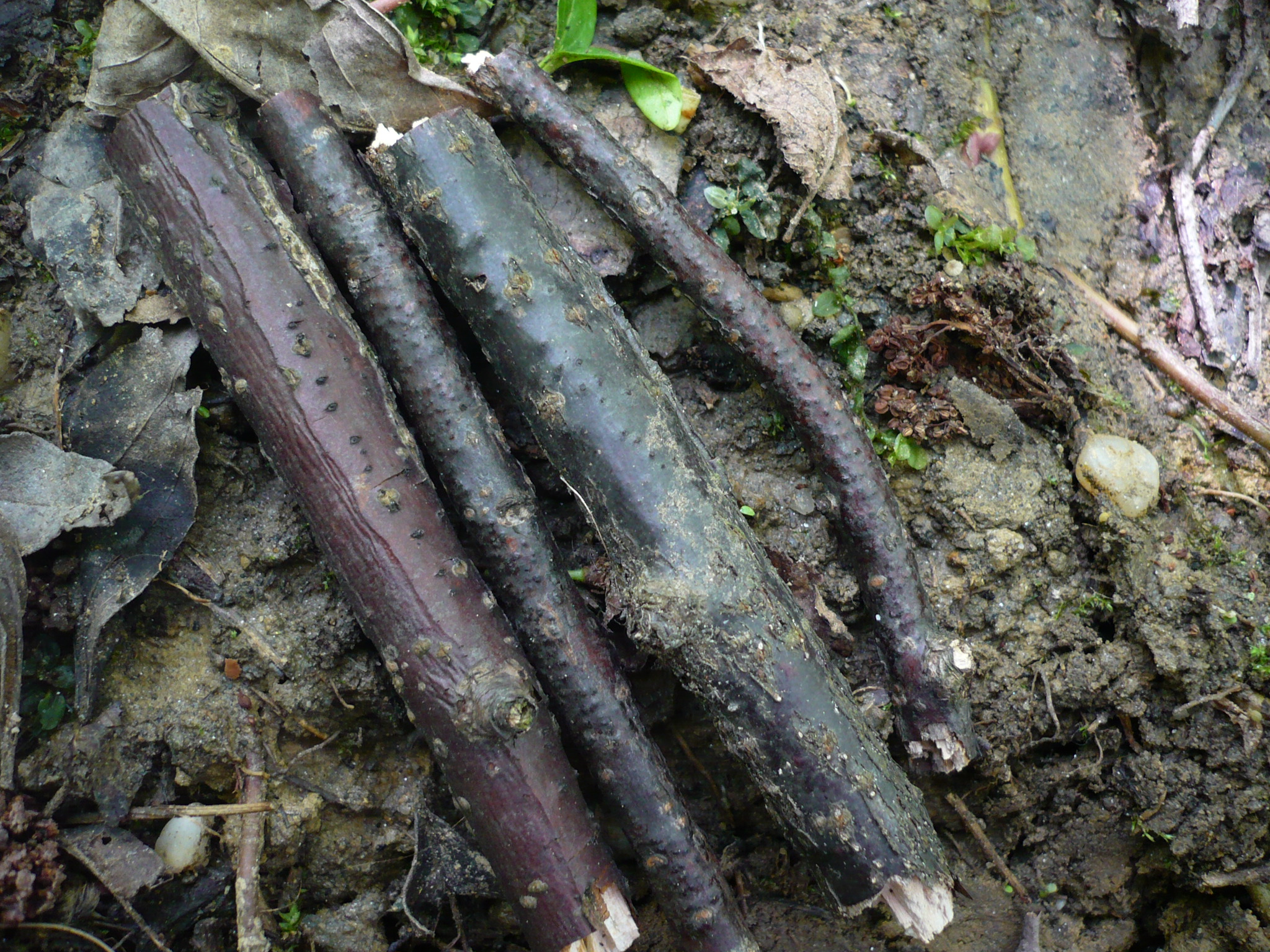

Scientific classification
- Domain: Eukaryota
- Kingdom: Fungi
- Division: Ascomycota
- Class: Sordariomycetes
- Order: Calosphaeriales
- Family: Pleurostomataceae; Réblová, L. Mostert, W. Gams & Crous (2004)

Genera
- Pleurostoma; Pleurostomophora

= Pleurostomataceae =

Family of fungi

Pleurostomataceae is a family of fungi in the order Calosphaeriales.
