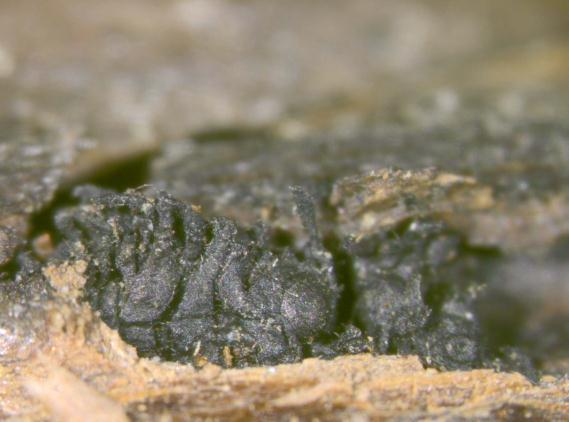
- Jattaea discreta

Scientific classification
- Kingdom: Fungi
- Division: Ascomycota
- Class: Sordariomycetes
- Order: Calosphaeriales
- Family: Calosphaeriaceae
- Genus: Jattaea; Berl. 1900

Species
- 16, see text.

= Jattaea =

Genus of fungi

Jattaea is a genus of fungi in the family Calosphaeriaceae.

The genus name of Jattaea is in honour of Antonio Jatta (1852–1912), who was an Italian politician and lichenologist..

The genus was circumscribed by Augusto Napoleone Berlese in Icon. Fung. vol.3 on page 6 in 1900.

== Species ==
- Jattaea algeriensis
- Jattaea berlesiana
- Jattaea brevirostris
- Jattaea ceanothina
- Jattaea cornina
- Jattaea curvicolla
- Jattaea faginea
- Jattaea herbicola
- Jattaea leucospermi
- Jattaea microtheca
- Jattaea mookgoponga
- Jattaea pleurostoma
- Jattaea prunicola
- Jattaea spermatozoides
- Jattaea stachybotryoides
- Jattaea villosa
