= Calosphaeria =

Scientific classification
- Kingdom: Fungi
- Division: Ascomycota
- Class: Sordariomycetes
- Order: Calosphaeriales
- Family: Calosphaeriaceae
- Genus: Calosphaeria; Tul. & C. Tul. 1863

Species
- See text.

Genus of fungi

Calosphaeria is a genus of fungi in the family Calosphaeriaceae.

== Species ==
- Calosphaeria abieticola
- Calosphaeria abietis
- Calosphaeria acaciae
- Calosphaeria acerina
- Calosphaeria affinis
- Calosphaeria africana
- Calosphaeria albojuncta
- Calosphaeria alnicola
- Calosphaeria alpina
- Calosphaeria ambigua
- Calosphaeria annonae
- Calosphaeria arctica
- Calosphaeria assecta
- Calosphaeria aurata
- Calosphaeria azadirachtae
- Calosphaeria benedicta
- Calosphaeria biformis
- Calosphaeria capillaris
- Calosphaeria caraganae
- Calosphaeria chilensis
- Calosphaeria ciliatula
- Calosphaeria cinchonae
- Calosphaeria connaricarpa
- Calosphaeria cornicola
- Calosphaeria corylina
- Calosphaeria crataegi
- Calosphaeria cryptospora
- Calosphaeria cyclospora
- Calosphaeria cylindrica
- Calosphaeria dryina
- Calosphaeria expers
- Calosphaeria fagi
- Calosphaeria fagicola
- Calosphaeria fallax
- Calosphaeria fici
- Calosphaeria finkii
- Calosphaeria fumanae
- Calosphaeria gregaria
- Calosphaeria hylodes
- Calosphaeria idaeicola
- Calosphaeria inconspicua
- Calosphaeria indica
- Calosphaeria ipomoeae
- Calosphaeria jonkershoekensis
- Calosphaeria jungens
- Calosphaeria kriegeriana
- Calosphaeria lantanae
- Calosphaeria ludens
- Calosphaeria ludwigiana
- Calosphaeria macrospora
- Calosphaeria microsperma
- Calosphaeria miniata
- Calosphaeria obvallata
- Calosphaeria obvoluta
- Calosphaeria occulta
- Calosphaeria pachydermata
- Calosphaeria parasitica
- Calosphaeria pezizoidea
- Calosphaeria pirellifera
- Calosphaeria pleurostoma
- Calosphaeria polyblasta
- Calosphaeria princeps
- Calosphaeria pulchella
- Calosphaeria pulchelloidea
- Calosphaeria punicae
- Calosphaeria pusilla
- Calosphaeria recedens
- Calosphaeria reniformis
- Calosphaeria rhododendri
- Calosphaeria rimicola
- Calosphaeria rosarum
- Calosphaeria rubicola
- Calosphaeria salicis-babylonicae
- Calosphaeria scabriseta
- Calosphaeria smilacis
- Calosphaeria socialis
- Calosphaeria striiformis
- Calosphaeria subcuticularis
- Calosphaeria sulcata
- Calosphaeria taediosa
- Calosphaeria tetraspora
- Calosphaeria transversa
- Calosphaeria tumidula
- Calosphaeria ulmicola
- Calosphaeria vasculosa
- Calosphaeria verrucosa
- Calosphaeria wahlenbergii
