= Pleurostomophora =

Scientific classification
- Kingdom: Fungi
- Division: Ascomycota
- Class: Sordariomycetes
- Order: Calosphaeriales
- Family: Pleurostomataceae
- Genus: Pleurostomophora; Vijaykr., L. Mostert, Jeewon, W. Gams, K.D. Hyde & Crous 2004

Species
- Pleurostomophora ootheca Pleurostomophora repens Pleurostomophora richardsiae

Genus of fungi

Pleurostomophora is a genus of fungi in the family Pleurostomataceae containing 3 species.
