= Phragmocalosphaeria =

Scientific classification
- Kingdom: Fungi
- Division: Ascomycota
- Class: Sordariomycetes
- Order: Calosphaeriales
- Family: Calosphaeriaceae
- Genus: Phragmocalosphaeria; Petr. 1923
- Species: P. piskorzii

Binomial name
- Phragmocalosphaeria piskorzii Petr. 1923

Genus of fungi

Phragmocalosphaeria is a monotypic genus of fungi in the family Calosphaeriaceae. It contains the sole species Phragmocalosphaeria piskorzii
