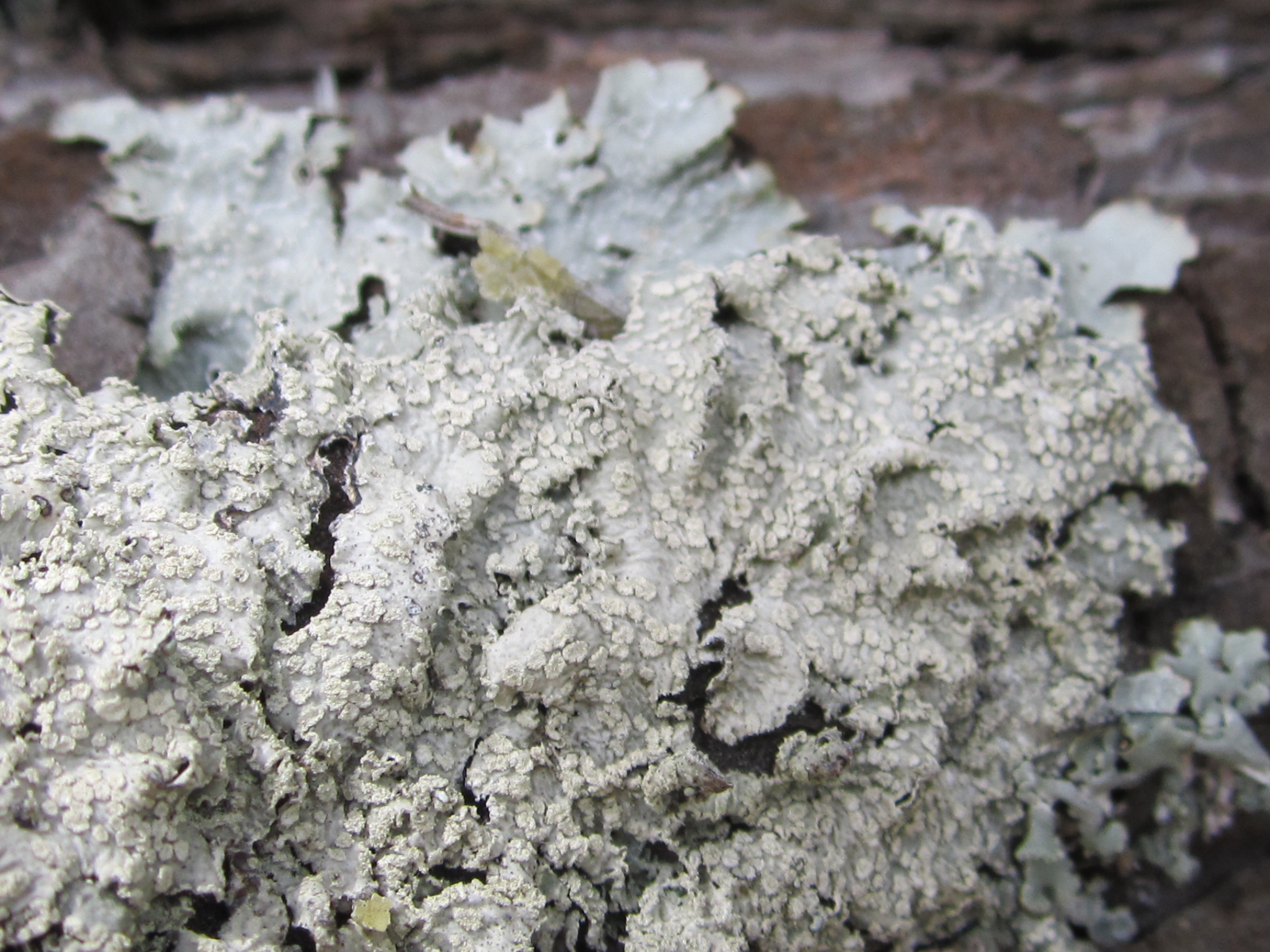
- Growing on pitch pine in Massachusetts, USA

Scientific classification
- Domain: Eukaryota
- Kingdom: Fungi
- Division: Ascomycota
- Class: Lecanoromycetes
- Order: Lecanorales
- Family: Parmeliaceae
- Genus: Punctelia
- Species: P. perreticulata

Binomial name
- Punctelia perreticulata (Räsänen) G.Wilh. & Ladd (1987)

Synonyms
- Parmelia duboscqii var. perreticulata Räsänen (1944); Parmelia perreticulata (Räsänen) Hale (1959)

= Punctelia perreticulata =

Species of lichen

Punctelia perreticulata is a widely distributed species of foliose lichen in the family Parmeliaceae. It occurs in Mediterranean Europe and Russia, North America, South America, Australia, and New Zealand, where it grows on rocks, bark, or wood. Its main distinguishing features are its thallus surface, marked with many shallow depressions, grooves, or pits, and sorediate pseudocyphellae. The lower side of the thallus is ivory to tan towards the centre and the major secondary metabolite in the medulla is lecanoric acid. A lookalike species with which it has been historically confused is Punctelia subrudecta; this lichen can be distinguished from Punctelia perreticulata by the texture of the thallus surface, or, more reliably, by the length of its conidia (asexual spores).

== Taxonomy ==
The lichen was originally described by Finnish lichenologist Veli Räsänen as Parmelia duboscqii var. perreticulata. The type specimen, found growing on a rock, was collected by Camillo Sbarbaro in Spotorno, Italy in 1936. Mason Hale reported discovering the taxon in central Texas. He promoted it to full species status in 1959 when he recombined it in the genus Parmelia as Parmelia perreticulata.

In 1982, Norwegian botanist Hildur Krog created the new genus Punctelia as a segregate genus of Parmelia to contain species with rounded pseudocyphellae. She considered Parmelia perreticulata to be synonymous with Punctelia subrudecta, although she did not provide a reason for this. In a 1987 publication, Gerould Wilhelm and Douglas Ladd suggested that Krog came to this decision because of "the lightly colored cortex and the presence of lecanoric acid and soredia, combined with the evident rareness of the perriticulate morphology and habitat data". They disagreed with Krog's proposed synonymy and argued that because of its distinct morphology (a strongly textured upper surface compared with the substantially less ridged upper surface of P. subrudecta) and differences in habitat, it should be considered a unique species.

The debate over this species' identity continued through the 1990s. In 1996, researchers proposed a broader definition of P. perreticulata that would include specimens with varying physical characteristics. However, DNA analysis in the 2000s revealed that what was thought to be a single variable species was actually several distinct species that look similar but are genetically different.

Later, the lichenologists Mónica Adler and Teuvo Ahti studied the conidia (asexual spores) of the two species; they did not consider that the morphology of the upper face of the thallus was sufficient to clearly define the species. They concluded that both species have a widespread distribution, and can be reliably distinguished from each other only by the length of their conidia. In 2000, Longán and colleagues found differences in the upper thallus face of the two species: pruina (a powdery deposit) was present in P. perreticulata and absent in P. subrudecta. Phylogenetic analysis of specimens collected from the USA and from China also support the notion that Parmelia perreticulata is distinct from P. subrudecta.

== Description ==
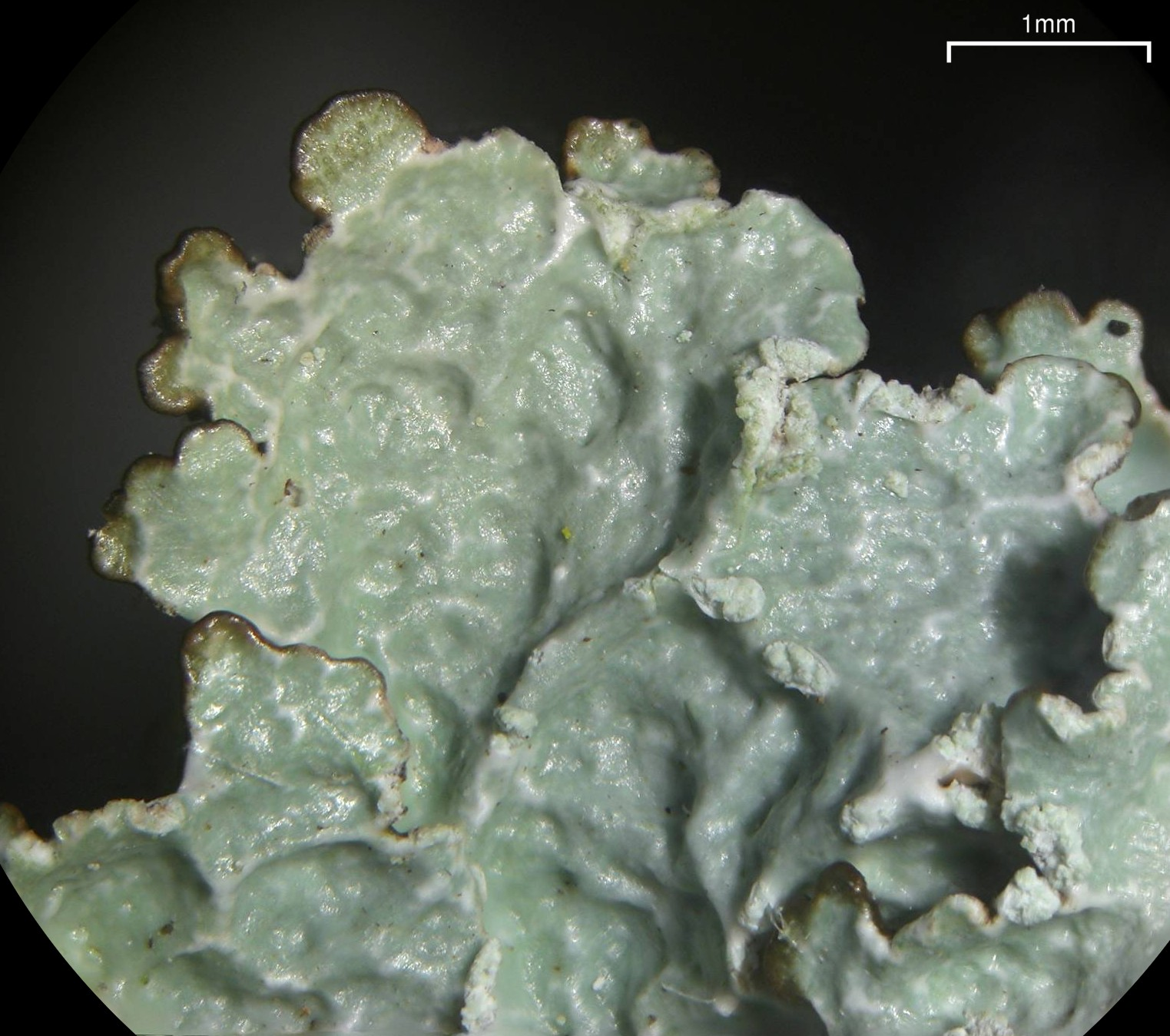
A closeup (30X magnification) of lobe tips. Note darkened lobe tips, scrobiculate surface texture, and some patches of soralia with granular soredia; scale bar is 1 mm.

The thallus of Punctelia perreticulata measures 5–10 cm (2–4 in) in diameter. It has either a close or loose attachment to its substrate (either bark, wood, or rock). The upper surface of the thallus is grey to greenish grey, and is often marked with shallow depressions and pits (scrobicules)–but not always. The lobes comprising the thallus are typically 2–4 mm (0.08–0.16 in) wide. The peripheral lobes are covered with pruina, which may be abundant, but not always on every lobe. In fresh specimens, the pruina gives the thallus a glaucous (greyish-blue) appearance. Pseudocyphellae are on both the surface of the thallus and its margins. They are point-like (punctiform) or oblong, sometimes elevated and located on ridges of the upper surface, but rarely restricted to the margins. The pseudocyphellae develop into secondary soralia with farinose (mealy) or granular soredia; these sometimes co-occur with phyllidia. Phyllidia are small, leaf-like or scale-like outgrowths from a foliose thallus, which are constricted at the point of attachment and thus readily detached and dispersed by wind or animals. The medulla is white, while the thallus undersurface is a light colour, described as pale buff to creamish, and often darker near the tips. Apothecia are very rarely observed in this species.

Ascospores of Punctelia perreticulata number eight per ascus; they are ellipsoid and typically measure 6.5–10 by 10–13 μm. The pycnidia are immersed in the surface of the thallus; the conidia are short- or long-filiform (threadlike), usually 6.5–11 μm long (although a range of 5–15 μm has been noted) and less than 1 μm thick.

The expected results of standard chemical spot tests in the cortex are K+ (yellow), C−, KC−, P−, and UV−; for the medulla they are K−, KC+ (red), C+ (red), P−, and UV−. The cortex contains minor or trace amounts of atranorin and chloroatranorin, while the medulla contains lecanoric acid as a major lichen product.

=== Similar species ===
Punctelia caseana and P. subrudecta are two other Punctelia species with a pale lower thallus surface, and which produce gyrophoric acid in the medulla. Punctelia perreticulata can be distinguished from these lookalikes microscopically (P. caesana has short, rod-like conidia, while P. subrudecta has hook-like conidia), and macroscopically (P. perreticulata is usually marked by conspicuous surface scrobicules). Punctelia jeckeri is another species with soralia, a pale underside, and lecanoric acid in the medulla; unlike P. perreticulata, its thallus is rugulose (covered with little wrinkles) to occasionally scrobiculate and its conidia are much shorter (3–5 by 1 μm).

The most reliable way to identify P. perreticulata is through its unique combination of characteristics. It produces medium-sized filiform conidia measuring 6.5–8 μm long, while its upper surface shows distinct scrobiculation, appearing as shallow depressions and pits. Additionally, it consistently displays pruina on its lobe tips. While other similar species may show one or two of these features, P. perreticulata is the only one that exhibits all of these traits together, making it distinguishable when carefully examined.

== Distribution and habitat ==
Punctelia perreticulata can be saxicolous, corticolous or lignicolous. It has been recorded from a large area of temperate eastern North America, with a westerly range to Colorado and California, and extending north into eastern Canada and south into Mexico (including Jalisco and Zacatecas) and Central America (Guatemala and Honduras). Its true North American range is thought to be poorly understood because of historical confusions with other similar species. In South America it is known from the Venezuelan Andes and from Argentina. It also occurs in Australia and New Zealand. In Europe the lichen has a distribution largely restricted to Mediterranean countries – specifically, Spain, France, and Italy – but it has also been recorded in Russia. In France, P. perreticulata is considered very rare.

In North America, its distribution is more specific than previously understood. The species is most commonly found in the Ozark ecoregion and scattered populations in similar habitats, particularly in areas with exposed rock formations known as glades. The lichen is most commonly found in old-growth conifers. Frequent substrates include the bark of Juniperus virginiana, Juniperus ashei, and Pinus echinata, although Quercus ilex, Cupressus, and Olea have also been recorded. Although it occurs most frequently on trees, it also grows on siliceous rock.

== Conservation ==
In 2013, Punctelia perreticulata was included on the Regional Red List of Italy as an endangered species.
