= Conidiotheca =

Scientific classification
- Kingdom: Fungi
- Division: Ascomycota
- Class: Sordariomycetes
- Order: Calosphaeriales
- Genus: Conidiotheca; Réblová & L. Mostert 2007
- Species: C. tympanoides

Binomial name
- Conidiotheca tympanoides (M.E. Barr) Réblová & L. Mostert 2007

Genus of fungi

Conidiotheca is a monotypic genus of fungi. It contains the sole species Conidiotheca tympanoides. The position of this genus within the order Calosphaeriales is unknown.
