= Wegelina =

Scientific classification
- Kingdom: Fungi
- Division: Ascomycota
- Class: Sordariomycetes
- Order: Calosphaeriales
- Family: Calosphaeriaceae
- Genus: Wegelina; Berl. 1900

Species
- See text.

Genus of fungi

Wegelina is a genus of fungi in the family Calosphaeriaceae containing 7 species.

== Species ==
- Wegelina cryptomeriae
- Wegelina discreta
- Wegelina grumsiniana
- Wegelina polyporina
- Wegelina saccardoana
- Wegelina sepulta
- Wegelina subdenudata
