= Togniniella =

Scientific classification
- Kingdom: Fungi
- Division: Ascomycota
- Class: Sordariomycetes
- Order: Calosphaeriales
- Family: Calosphaeriaceae
- Genus: Togniniella; Réblová, L. Mostert, W. Gams & Crous 2004
- Species: T. acerosa

Binomial name
- Togniniella acerosa Réblová, L. Mostert, W. Gams & Crous 2004

Genus of fungi

Togniniella is a monotypic genus of fungi in the family Calosphaeriaceae. It contains the sole species Togniniella acerosa.
