= Calosphaeriophora =

Scientific classification
- Kingdom: Fungi
- Division: Ascomycota
- Class: Sordariomycetes
- Order: Calosphaeriales
- Family: Calosphaeriaceae
- Genus: Calosphaeriophora; Réblová, L. Mostert, W. Gams & Crous 2004
- Species: C. pulchella

Binomial name
- Calosphaeriophora pulchella Réblová, L. Mostert, W. Gams & Crous 2004

Genus of fungi

Calosphaeriophora is a monotypic genus of fungi in the family Calosphaeriaceae. It contains the sole species Calosphaeriophora pulchella
