= Calosphaeriaceae =

Scientific classification
- Domain: Eukaryota
- Kingdom: Fungi
- Division: Ascomycota
- Class: Sordariomycetes
- Order: Calosphaeriales
- Family: Calosphaeriaceae; Munk (1957)

Genera
- See text

Family of fungi

Calosphaeriaceae is a family of fungi in the order Calosphaeriales.

== Genera ==
- Calosphaeria
- Calosphaeriophora
- Jattaea
- Kacosphaeria
- Pachytrype
- Phaeocrella
- Phragmocalosphaeria
- Togniniella
- Wegelina
