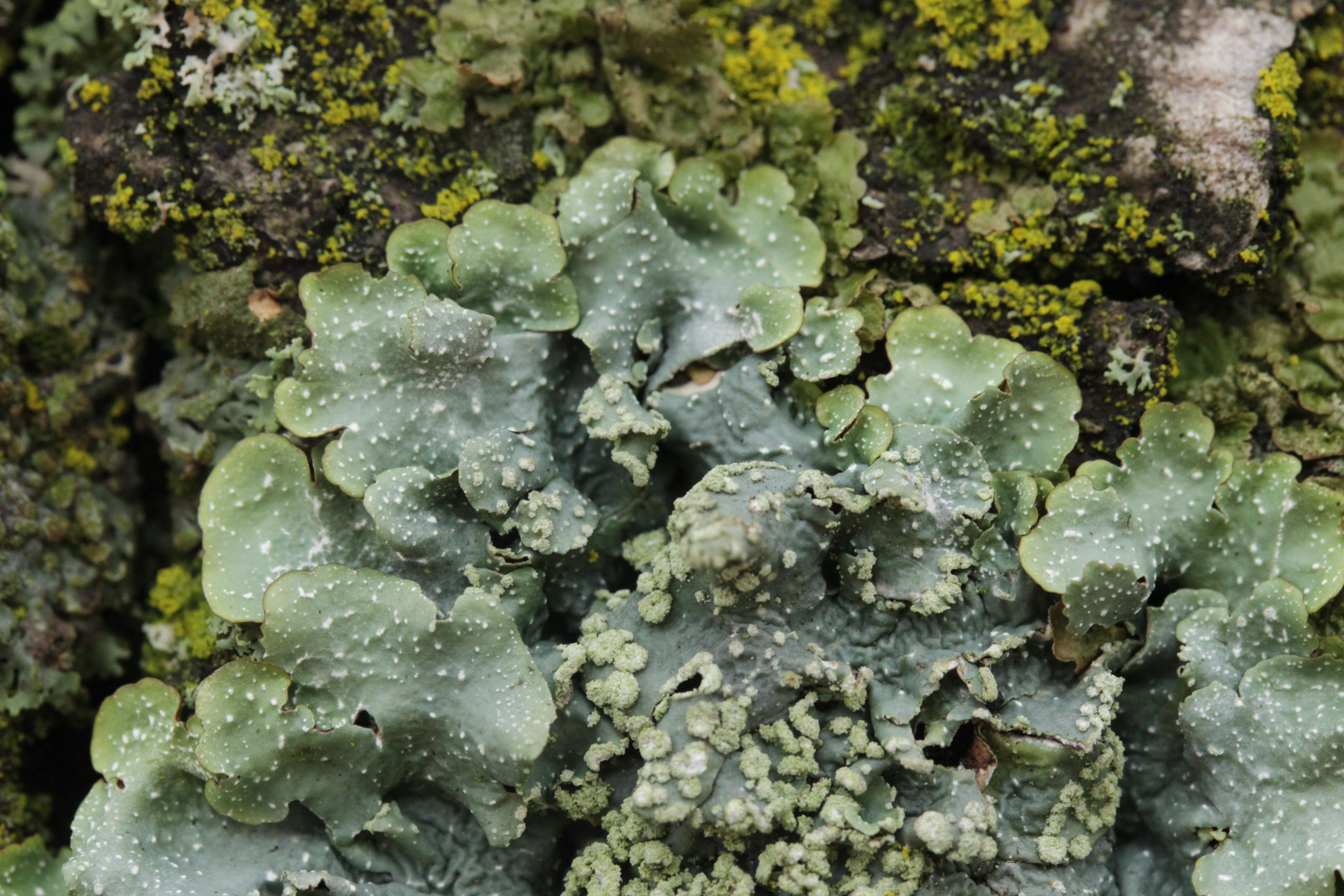

Scientific classification
- Kingdom: Fungi
- Division: Ascomycota
- Class: Lecanoromycetes
- Order: Lecanorales
- Family: Parmeliaceae
- Genus: Punctelia
- Species: P. subrudecta

Binomial name
- Punctelia subrudecta (Nyl.) Krog (1982)

Synonyms
- Parmelia subrudecta Nyl. (1886); Parmelia borreri var. subrudecta (Nyl.) Clauzade & Cl.Roux (1982)

= Punctelia subrudecta =

Species of lichen in the family Parmeliaceae

Punctelia subrudecta is a species of foliose lichen in the family Parmeliaceae. Originally described in 1886 as Parmelia subrudecta, it was transferred to the genus Punctelia in 1982. For much of the twentieth century, North American specimens were misidentified as this species, until molecular phylogenetics studies in 2010 revealed that they represented three distinct species, restricting the true P. subrudecta to Old World populations. The lichen forms loosely attached rosettes with narrow, pale grey-green lobes and is distinguished by its pale underside, fine powdery reproductive structures (soredia), and distinctive hook-shaped conidia. It is found primarily in temperate and Mediterranean woodlands of Europe, Macaronesia, and parts of North and East Africa, where it grows on tree bark and occasionally on rock surfaces.

== Taxonomy ==
The Finnish lichenologist William Nylander described the species in 1886 as Parmelia subrudecta. In his succinct Latin protologue Nylander wrote that the thallus "resembles P. rudecta Ach., agreeing even in the CaCl_{2} reaction, yet differs by its sublageniform (flask-shaped) spermatogonia, which bear spermatia 4.5 × 0.6 μm; apothecia were not seen, and the type material was rupicolous (rock-dwelling)". Hildur Krog transferred the taxon to the newly erected genus Punctelia in 1982, retaining Nylander's epithet and placing the species within Parmeliaceae.

For much of the twentieth century North-American material with a pale lower surface and a medulla containing lecanoric acid was routinely identified as P. subrudecta. A continent-wide molecular and morphological study by James Lendemer and Brendan Hodkinson published in 2010 demonstrated that these specimens represent three distinct species—P. caseana, P. jeckeri; (≡ P. ulophylla), and P. perreticulata—none of which is conspecific with the European P. subrudecta sensu stricto (in the strict sense). Their ITS phylogeny recovered three well-supported clades that correlated with traits previously dismissed as unreliable, namely conidial type and length (unciform vs long filiform), the presence or absence of scrobiculae on the upper cortex, and the development of pruina on lobe tips. By integrating these characters with sequence data, the authors resurrected conidial morphology as a useful diagnostic feature and restricted the application of P. subrudecta to European and African populations that bear unciform (hook-like) conidia 4–6 μm long.

Within Punctelia, P. subrudecta now represents the sorediate, lecanoric-acid-producing lineage with a pale undersurface and unciform conidia, distinct from the closely related P. perreticulata (short filiform conidia, scrobiculate upper surface), P. caseana (long filiform conidia, epruinose lobes), and P. jeckeri (long filiform conidia, pruinose lobes). The clarified circumscription means that confirmed records of P. subrudecta are confined to Europe, Macaronesia and parts of North Africa; all purported North-American reports have been reassigned. The study also provided a key to North-American Punctelia species and formally described P. caseana, underscoring the importance of coupling DNA evidence with careful re-evaluation of traditional morphological markers when resolving species complexes within the Parmeliaceae.

== Description ==
The thallus of Punctelia subrudecta is foliose and usually forms loosened rosettes several centimetres across. Lobes are rather narrow (mostly 2–4 mm wide), flat to slightly ridged, and display a pale grey-green colour that darkens when wet. The upper surface is smooth and lacks the shallow pits (scrobiculae) that give P. perreticulata its reticulate look; it is also free of the frost-like bloom (pruina) that dusts the lobe tips of P. jeckeri. Minute white pores (pseudocyphellae) are scattered but never abundant.

Vegetative reproduction dominates in P. subrudecta. Powdery propagules called soredia—tiny balls of algal cells wrapped in fungal threads—break through the cortex in discrete patches known as soralia. In P. subrudecta the soralia first appear along lobe edges and secondary lobes; older parts of the thallus may also develop scattered laminal soralia, but the soredia remain fine and never coarsen into isidioid granules. The lower surface is characteristically pale off-white to light tan (never black) and bears sparse, similarly pale anchoring rhizines, a combination that helps separate the species from dark-undersided members of the genus.

Microscopically the pycnidia produce unciform (gently hook-shaped) conidia only 4–6 μm long—one of the most reliable diagnostic characters, because related North-American taxa have straight, much longer conidia. Apothecia are rare; when present they are lecanorine (thallus-coloured rim) and may develop sorediate margins. The ascospores have been reported as broadly ellipsoid, 14–17 × 10–12 μm, though most populations reproduce purely by soredia. Adler and Ahti measured 25 % of their worldwide collections and found that the unciform conidia of P. subrudecta have a modal length of 4–5.5 μm (range 3.5–6.5 μm) and are sometimes intermixed with a few straight conidia, whereas lobe width spans (1–)2–4(–8) mm, overlapping completely with that of P. perreticulata; they therefore dismissed lobe width as a diagnostic trait.

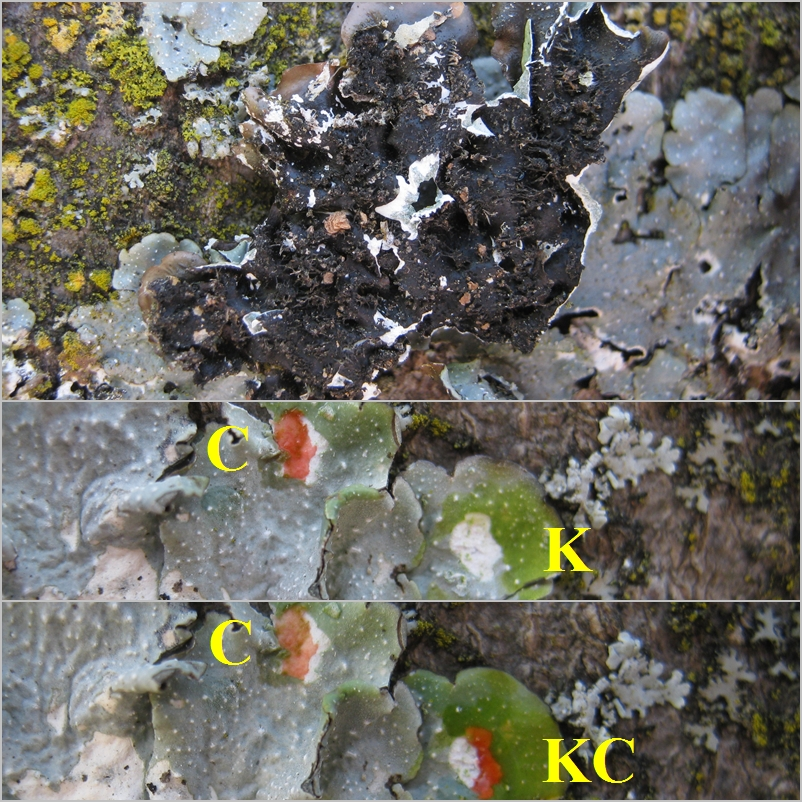
Spot tests

Chemical spot tests are distinctive: the cortex contains atranorin (K+ yellow), while the medulla is rich in lecanoric acid and turns pale pink to salmon in the C test—a subtler hue than the deep crimson produced by P. borreri. These reactions, together with the pale underside, fine soredia and hooked conidia, provide a concise field and laboratory profile that separates P. subrudecta from superficially similar grey sorediate parmelioid lichens. Trace-level variation occurs in European material: thin-layer chromatography of 216 Polish specimens detected atranorin only in about 30 % of thalli, even though lecanoric acid was consistently present in the medulla.

Microscope studies show that the photobiont is the green alga Trebouxia gelatinosa. At high magnification the algal cells appear irregular in outline and have a thick wall; each cell contains a multi-lobed chloroplast with a single, decolorans-type pyrenoid—a carbon-fixing body that is pierced by parallel pyrenotubules and surrounded by starch grains called pyrenoglobules. The fungal hyphae either press directly against the algal wall or extend short, type-1 intraparietal haustoria into it. DNA sequencing of Iberian material shows that P. subrudecta teams up with only a few, uncommon genetic lineages of T. gelatinosa, two of which it shares with P. borreri; this pattern points to a symbiosis that is selective yet locally adaptable.

== Habitat and distribution ==
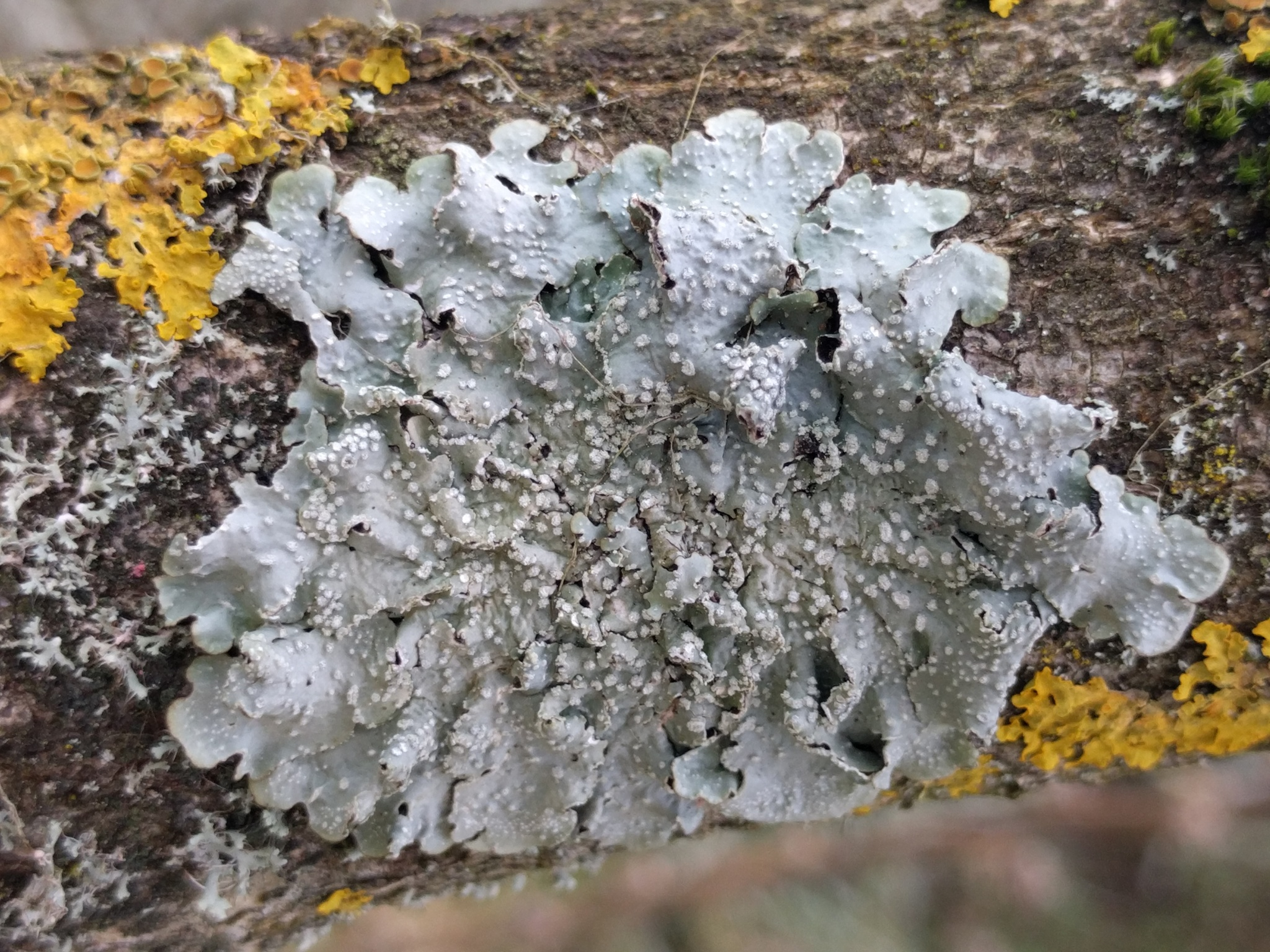
In the Netherlands

Punctelia subrudecta is predominantly corticolous, forming tightly attached rosettes on the bark of trees in temperate and Mediterranean woodlands; specimens examined from the Iberian Peninsula were taken almost exclusively from trunks and branches, with only occasional collections on siliceous rock faces that mimic bark microclimates. Populations recorded in Atlantic oak forests and in the drier, eastern Mediterranean mountains show that the species tolerates a broad moisture gradient, provided atmospheric pollution remains low. Thalli from heavily trafficked coastal sites in eastern Spain show pink central necrosis and marginal bleaching, symptoms the authors link to chronic oxidant and nitrogen pollution. Polish herbarium data show the species colonises a wide range of phorophytes, most frequently oak (Quercus, 26 % of records) but also alder (Alnus, 13 %), European ash (Fraxinus excelsior, 11 %), small-leaved linden (Tilia cordata, 11 %), willow (Salix, 10 %) and a suite of other broad-leaved hosts; rare saxicolous thalli have even been found on wood and concrete.

Sequence-verified collections confirm an essentially Old-World range stretching from Fennoscandia south to the Mediterranean, eastwards into Kenya and at least parts of China and Australasia; records from the Americas are now considered misidentifications. Within Europe the species is widespread, having been documented in at least thirty countries, but it shows marked regional bias: in Poland, for example, it is largely confined to the Carpathian and Sudeten foothills and is scarce in the north and west. Because of continuing declines linked to air pollution and roadside tree removal, P. subrudecta is listed as vulnerable on the Polish Red List and enjoys full legal protection there. National assessments echo a broader European trend: the lichen is now legally protected in Poland and Norway and is flagged as expanding northwards in areas where sulphur dioxide levels have fallen, yet remains threatened where mature roadside trees are felled for road modernisation.
