= Trebouxia gelatinosa =

Scientific classification
- Kingdom: Plantae
- Division: Chlorophyta
- Class: Trebouxiophyceae
- Order: Trebouxiales
- Family: Trebouxiaceae
- Genus: Trebouxia
- Species: T. gelatinosa

Binomial name
- Trebouxia gelatinosa Ahmadjian ex Archibald, 1975

Species of green alga

Trebouxia gelatinosa is a common symbiotic species of green alga in the family Trebouxiaceae. Formally described as new to science in 1975, it is usually found in association with different species of lichen-forming fungi.

== Taxonomy ==
The alga was originally isolated in 1960 by lichenologist Vernon Ahmadjian from the foliose lichen species now known as Flavoparmelia caperata. Patricia Archibald formally described the species in 1975. The alga was later found to be a photobiont in Anzia, another genus of foliose lichens in the large family Parmeliaceae.

== Description ==
Trebouxia gelatinosa is characterised by its vegetative cells which are typically spherical, though occasionally they may be oviform (egg-shaped). During the log phase of growth, these cells measure between 5 and 16 micrometres (μm) in diameter and are encased in walls that are 1 μm or less in thickness. As the cells enter the stationary phase of their growth cycle, they do not increase significantly in size, but instead develop a gelatinous sheath around each individual cell, measuring 1.5 to 2 μm in thickness.

The chloroplast within these cells is notable for containing a single, angular, and central pyrenoid, which appears to be encircled by a continuous sheath of starch, and each cell is uninucleate, meaning it contains a single nucleus. The ultrastructure of the pyrenoids of most Trebouxia species has been catalogued and found to fall into eight different type based on the arrangements and forms of thylakoid lamellae within the pyrenoid matrix. The gelatinosa- type pyrenoids are traversed by thin parallel-arranged tubules. Knowing the pyrenoid structure sometimes enables the identification of some Trebouxia species in the lichen thallus without the need to culture the alga.

Trebouxia gelatinosa reproduces through both zoospores and aplanospores. Zoospores are motile reproductive cells, measuring about 4 μm in width and 6 to 8 μm in length, with their nucleus located towards the rear or the middle of the cell. A stigma (a light-sensitive spot found in some algae) has not been observed in these cells.

== Physiology ==
Trebouxia gelatinosa shows remarkable desiccation tolerance primarily through stable expression of its protein-coding genes during dehydration and rehydration cycles. About 92% of these genes maintain consistent expression levels, suggesting inherent, constitutive mechanisms for its tolerance. Key changes occur in genes related to photosynthesis, reactive oxygen species (ROS)-scavenging, heat shock proteins, aquaporins, expansins, and desiccation-related proteins (DRPs), with some traits unique to T. gelatinosa's symbiotic nature. Unlike in other desiccation-tolerant species, late embryogenesis abundant proteins in T. gelatinosa do not show significant changes. Additionally, a phylogenetic analysis indicates that chlorophyte DRPs, unlike those in embryophytes, might have been acquired from extremophile bacteria through horizontal gene transfer, reflecting their symbiotic relationship within the lichen thallus.

Trebouxia gelatinosa shows changes in gene expression linked to desiccation tolerance when subjected to water loss. The alga's ability to survive and recover from severe dehydration is a characteristic shared by various organisms that inhabit environments with unpredictable water availability. During desiccation, T. gelatinosa undergoes physiological and morphological changes, including the loss of cell turgor, an indicator of water stress. A study on T. gelatinosa focused on understanding how its water status impacts the expression of genes associated with stress and desiccation tolerance. It was found that several genes change expression during different stages of dehydration, particularly around the point of turgor loss, indicating the activation of mechanisms to cope with water loss. However, the expression of some genes remained unaffected, suggesting a reliance on constitutive mechanisms for desiccation tolerance.

Trebouxia gelatinosa was observed to interact with graphene-based materials (GBMs), including few-layers graphene (FLG) and graphene oxide (GO), without internalizing them. Short-term and long-term exposure to these materials showed that FLG affected the algae's cell wall and plasma membrane interaction, leading to a down-regulation of a stress-related gene, similar to oxidative stress response. However, GO had no significant effect. Despite these interactions, there were no long-term harmful impacts on the algae's growth, photosynthesis, or gene expression, indicating a level of resilience or tolerance in Trebouxia gelatinosa to these materials.

== Reproduction and life cycle ==
Zoosporogenesis, the formation of motile spores known as zoospores, occurs in Trebouxia gelatinosa. This phenomenon is especially significant in the context of lichens, where zoosporogenesis is typically suppressed in favour of aplanospore (a non-motile spore formed by direct transformation of a vegetative cell) formation. In Trebouxia gelatinosa, zoospores can form within the natural lichen thallus and in isolated thallus fragments. These zoospores have the potential to be released from the thallus, leading to the establishment of free-living microcolonies. These microcolonies can interact with fungal symbionts (mycobionts) from the same or different species, potentially forming new lichen associations. This process of natural resynthesis might contribute to the observed diversity and heterogeneity in fungal populations within lichen species.
