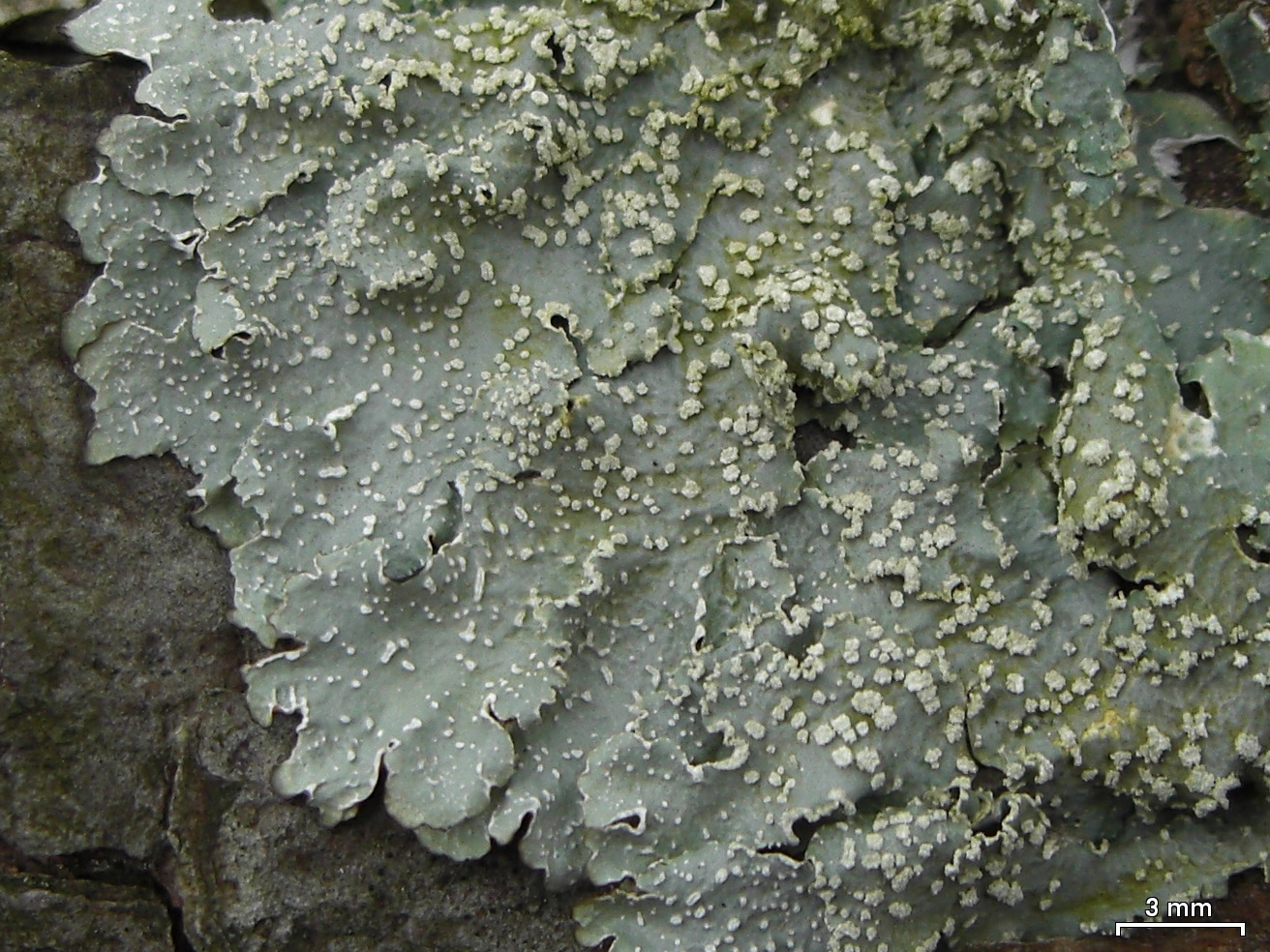
- in the Delmarva Peninsula, USA

Conservation status
- Least Concern (IUCN 3.1)

- Secure (NatureServe)

Scientific classification
- Kingdom: Fungi
- Division: Ascomycota
- Class: Lecanoromycetes
- Order: Lecanorales
- Family: Parmeliaceae
- Genus: Punctelia
- Species: P. caseana

Binomial name
- Punctelia caseana Lendemer & B.P.Hodk. (2010)

= Punctelia caseana =

Species of lichen

Punctelia caseana is a species of foliose lichen in the family Parmeliaceae. Its range covers eastern North America, extending south to central and northern Mexico, where it grows on the bark of many species of hardwood and conifer trees.

== Taxonomy ==
Punctelia caseana was described as a new species in 2010 by lichenologists James Lendemer and Brendan Hodkinson. The type was collected in the Nature Conservancy reserve in Atlantic County, New Jersey. The specific epithet caseana honors Martha A. Case, who was an undergraduate professor of Hodkinson and encouraged his interest in lichenology.

== Description ==
The color of the upper surface of the thallus of Punctelia caseana is grey-blue, while the undersurface is pale to off-white, sometimes light brown. The size of the thallus is quite variable, depending largely on the microhabitat conditions. There are many soralia, which are mostly located along the margins of the lobes. The soredia are coarse and large. Ascospores produced by the lichen are hyaline, measuring 14–17 by 10–12 μm. It contains the secondary compounds atranorin, chloroatroanorin, and lecanoric acid. The standard lichen spot test results are K+ (yellow), C−, KC−, P−, and UV− in the upper cortex; in the medulla they are K−, KC+ (red), C+ (red), P−, and UV−.

Punctelia caseana can be readily distinguished from the common North American species Punctelia rudecta because the latter has isidia rather than soredia. Two lookalikes, Punctelia perrituculata and P. subrudecta, both produce medullary gyrophoric acid and have a pale lower surface, like Punctelia caseana. However, they have short conidia, and P. perrituculata has a surface texture covered with small round pits or grooves (scrobiculae).

== Habitat and distribution ==
It is found in the eastern United States on many types of hardwood trees, as well as conifers, and occasionally on rotting logs. Its distribution in the eastern US is similar to that of Punctelia subrudecta. The range of Punctelia caseana was later extended to include eastern and central Mexico.

== Conservation ==
In 2021, Punctelia caseana was assessed for the global IUCN Red List. Because it has an abundant and widespread population in North America with no sign of decline, it is considered a species of least concern.
