= Xerocomellus zelleri =

Scientific classification
- Kingdom: Fungi
- Division: Basidiomycota
- Class: Agaricomycetes
- Order: Boletales
- Family: Boletaceae
- Genus: Xerocomellus
- Species: X. zelleri

Binomial name
- Xerocomellus zelleri (Murrill) Klofac (2011)

Synonyms
- Ceriomyces zelleri Murrill (1912); Boletus zelleri (Murrill) Murrill (1912); Xerocomus zelleri (Murrill) Snell (1944); Boletellus zelleri (Murrill) Singer, Snell & E.A.Dick (1960)

Species of fungus

Xerocomellus zelleri
- Mycological characteristics
- Pores on hymenium
- Cap is convex or flat
- Hymenium is adnate
- Stipe is bare
- Spore print is olive-brown
- Ecology is mycorrhizal
- Edibility is edible

Xerocomellus zelleri, commonly known as Zeller's bolete, is a species of fungus in the family Boletaceae. First described scientifically by American mycologist William Alphonso Murrill in 1912, it has been juggled by various authors to several genera, including Boletus, Boletellus, and Xerocomus.

The fruit bodies are distinguished by their dark reddish brown to nearly black caps with uneven surfaces, the yellow pores on the underside of the caps, and the red-streaked yellow stems. The development of the fruit bodies is gymnocarpic, meaning that the hymenium appears and develops to maturity in an exposed state, not enclosed by any protective membrane.

Found solely in western North America from British Columbia south to Mexico, the mushroom grows in summer and autumn on the ground, often in Douglas-fir forests or on their margins. It is edible but not choice.

== Taxonomy ==
Xerocomellus zelleri was first described by American mycologist William Alphonso Murrill in 1912, based on specimens he found on the campus of the University of Washington. Murrill named it Ceriomyces zelleri before switching the genus later that year to Boletus. In 1944, Walter Henry Snell thought the taxon would be more appropriate in the genus Xerocomus. In 1959, mycologists Rolf Singer, Snell and Esther A. Dick transferred the species to Boletellus, explaining that the microstructure of the trama and the faint ornamentation of the spores were inconsistent with placement in Xerocomus. American mycologist Harry D. Thiers, in his 1976 monograph on North American boletes, claimed that he failed to consistently find ornamentation on the spores of material he collected, and preferred to retain the species in Boletus. In 2011, it was moved to the genus Xerocomellus.

The specific epithet zelleri was chosen by Murrill to honor Professor Sanford Myron Zeller, mycologist at Oregon State University. Zeller accompanied Murrill in his Seattle expedition, and discovered the first specimens of the mushroom.

== Description ==
The cap is typically between 3–16 cm (1 1/8–6 1/4 in) in diameter, initially convex but flattening somewhat in maturity. It is fleshy, with an uneven velvety surface, and dark brown to nearly black; the margin of the cap is a pale cream color. Young specimens are covered by a grayish bloom.

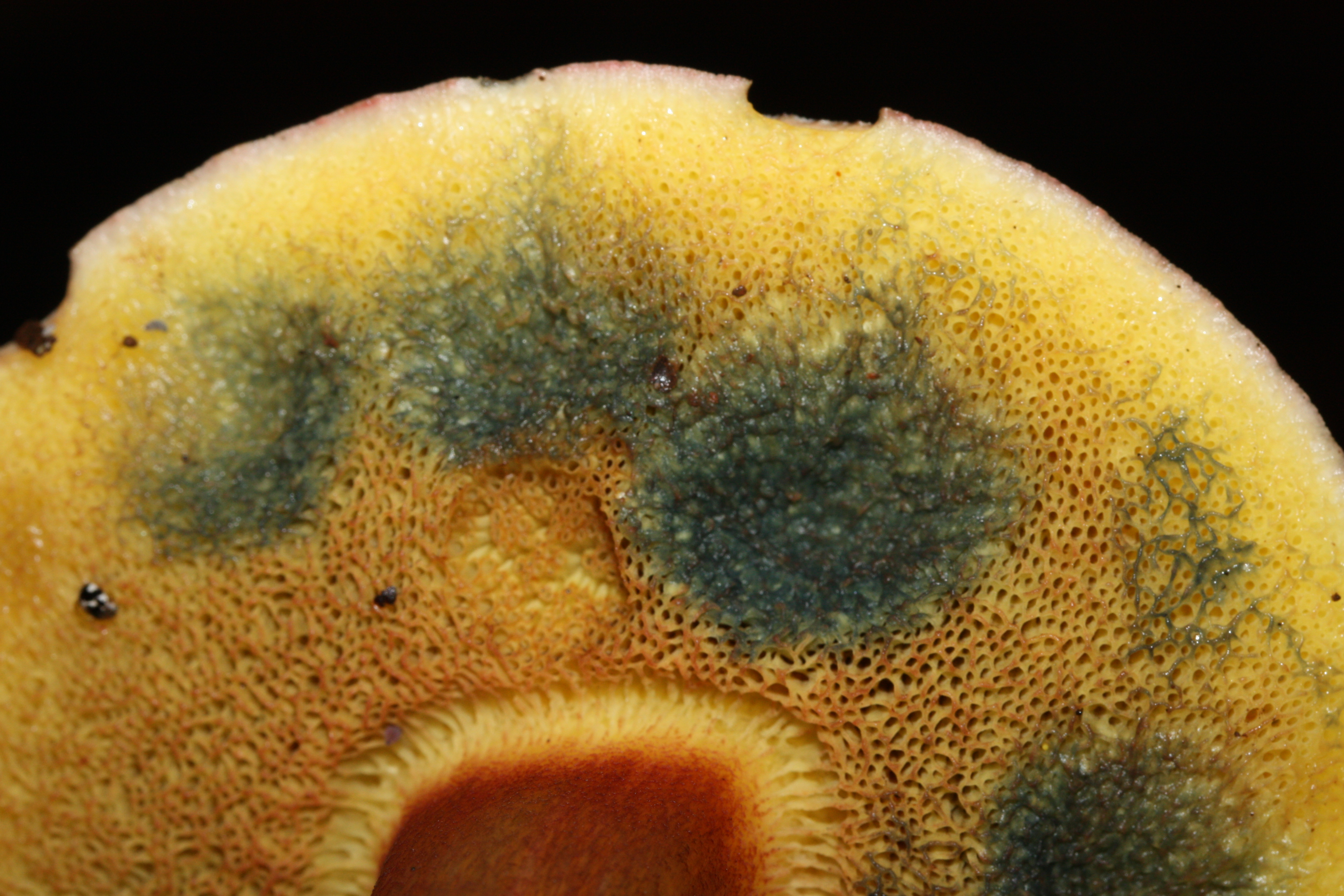
The yellow to dirty yellow flesh inconsistently bruises blue when cut or broken.

The tubes that comprise the undersurface of the cap (the hymenium) are up to 1.5 cm (5/8 in) long and angular, yellow, becoming dirty yellow and finally greenish-yellow; there are 1–2 pores per millimeter on the hymenium surface. They may turn slightly brownish when exposed to the air for a time. The flesh is yellow to dirty yellow, up to 1.5 cm (5/8 in) thick, and inconsistently bruises blue when cut or broken. The stem is up to 12 cm (4 3/4 in) tall, 1–3 cm (3/8–1 1/8 in) thick, and swollen toward the base. The stem surface is red or yellowish with red lines, often white or yellow at the base, and solid (that is, not hollow), with fibrous flesh; in maturity the stem ages to yellowish-red to dark red. The spore print is olive-brown, with one source noting that it may be juicy.

The spores are ellipsoid in shape, smooth, and have dimensions of 12–16 by 4–6 μm, although occasionally there will be some "giant spores" with lengths of up to 24 μm. The basidia, the spore-bearing cells, are 26–35 by 9.5–12 μm, and four-spored. The cystidia are roughly cylindrical and thin-walled, with dimensions of 38–77 by 5.5–14.8 μm. There are no clamp connections present in the hyphae. The fruit body tissue stains a greenish color when a drop of ammonia solution is applied.

=== Fruit body development ===
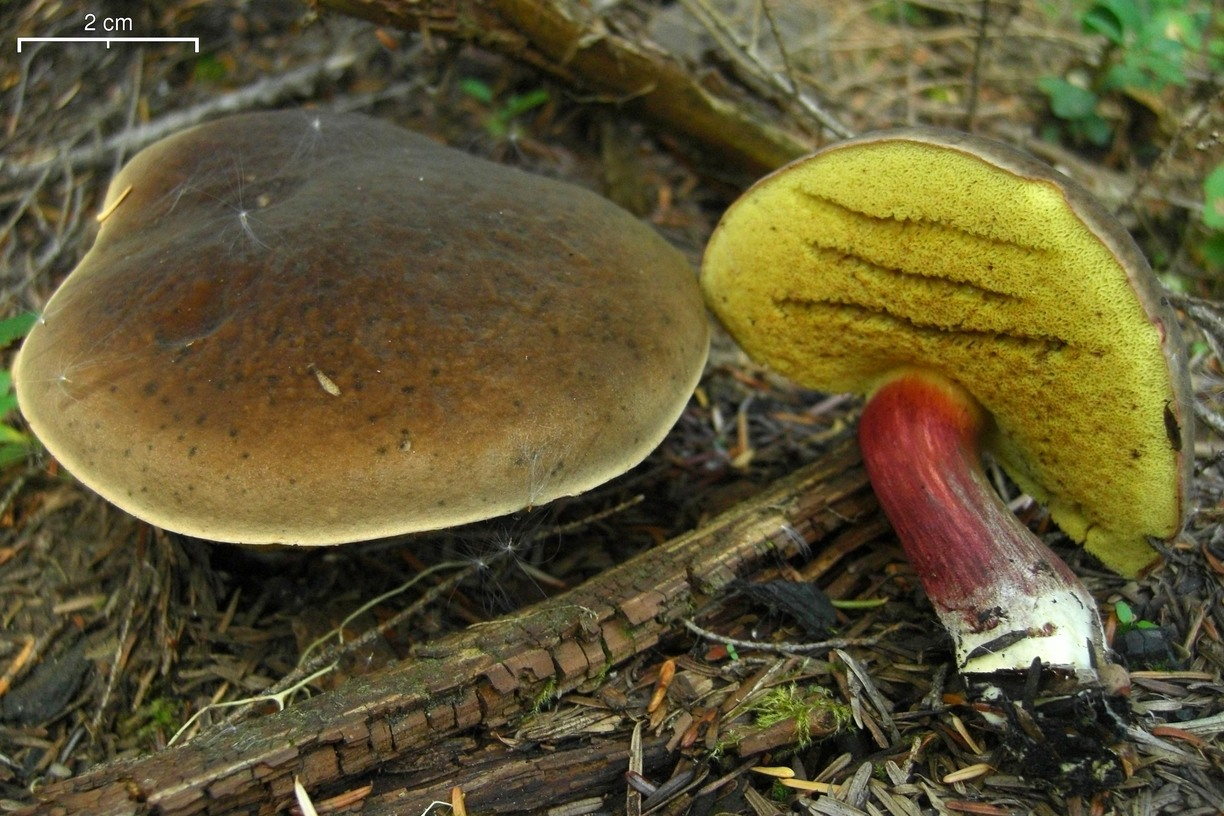
Specimens from Incomappleux Inland Rainforest in British Columbia

In 1914, Zeller published a study of the development of the mushroom, made possible by the prolific fruiting of the fungus in Seattle in the fall of 1912. Development was studied by examining thin sections of tissues in different stages of development, and the differentiation of tissues and structures followed by using histological stains. The growth form of Xerocomellus zelleri is called gymnocarpic, meaning that the hymenium appears and develops to maturity in an exposed state, not enclosed by any protective membrane. In this type of development, the cap is formed from hyphae at the top of the stem and subsequently expands by growth along the margins; the hymenium forms later beneath the cap in a direction away from the center.

The mushrooms originate as minute fruit bodies (called "pins" due to their shape) from a yellow mycelium that forms a mat and tends to engulf pine needles. The pins, typically 1–2 mm in diameter, lengthen vertically until they are roughly three or four times longer than they are thick. Until this point, the fruit body is a homogenous mass of tissue. It differentiates simultaneously into cap and stem along a cleavage plane (an axis along which any cell division occurs) from the outside inward, which gives rise to deep furrow encircling the fruit body. The hymenium is formed in the roof of this furrow, growing inward and upward from the outside edge. The cap develops from the upper section of this division, the stem from the lower.

=== Similar species ===
The red-cracked bolete (Xerocomellus chrysenteron) has an olive-brown cap that cracks, exposing flesh that ages to pinkish red. Boletellus chrysenteroides, found only in eastern North America, has a velvety to smooth, dark reddish brown, cracked cap with pale exposed flesh. Also similar is Boletus mirabilis.

== Habitat and distribution ==
This species grows solitarily or in small groups on the ground or in forest duff in mature coniferous forests, occasionally abundant on grassy edges of the forest, rarely on badly decayed conifer logs. It is an ectomycorrhizal mushroom, meaning that the fungal hyphae form sheaths around the rootlets of certain trees, exchanging nutrients with them in a mutualistic relationship. The fungus associates with alder, poplar and other hardwoods, and has been shown in laboratory culture to form ectomycorrhizae with Western Hemlock (Tsuga heterophylla). However, the fungus may have saprobic tendencies, as it has been noted to grow under California Redwood (sometimes in the rotted wood of old trunks), a tree not known to form mycorrizhae. It is known to form long rhizomorphs (aggregations of hyphae that resemble roots), and has been noted to be more abundant in sites with buried wood than without. In British Columbia, it occurs from summer to early winter, although it also appears infrequently in early spring. In California, the mushroom often fruits after the rainy period in autumn through to March or April. The dark coloring of the cap make this species difficult to notice, "unless a glimpse of the yellow hymenium is obtained". Fruit bodies are eaten by the American shrew-mole.

Xerocomellus zelleri is distributed in North America in the Pacific Northwest south to California and Mexico. In Mexico, it has been reported in high-altitude cloud forests of Mexican Beech (Fagus mexicana), a rare and endangered habitat. It has also been reported from Tibet, but this may be based on a misidentification.

== Edibility ==
Xerocomellus zelleri is an edible species, although care should be taken to ensure that specimens collected for consumption are free of fly larvae. In his book 100 Edible Mushrooms, Michael Kuo gave the mushroom an edibility rating of "mediocre". There is no distinguishable odor and the taste is alternately described as pleasant, mild, or "slightly acidic". The original species description noted that the texture was "slightly mucilaginous". The mushroom is suitable for preserving or drying, or as a "filler" to add bulk to a dish. It is harvested and sold commercially in local markets in British Columbia.

== Chemistry ==
Xerocomellus zelleri has been shown to contain the phenethylamine alkaloid compounds tyramine, N-methyltyramine, and hordenine, although the chemotaxonomic significance of this is not clear.

== See also ==
- List of North American boletes
