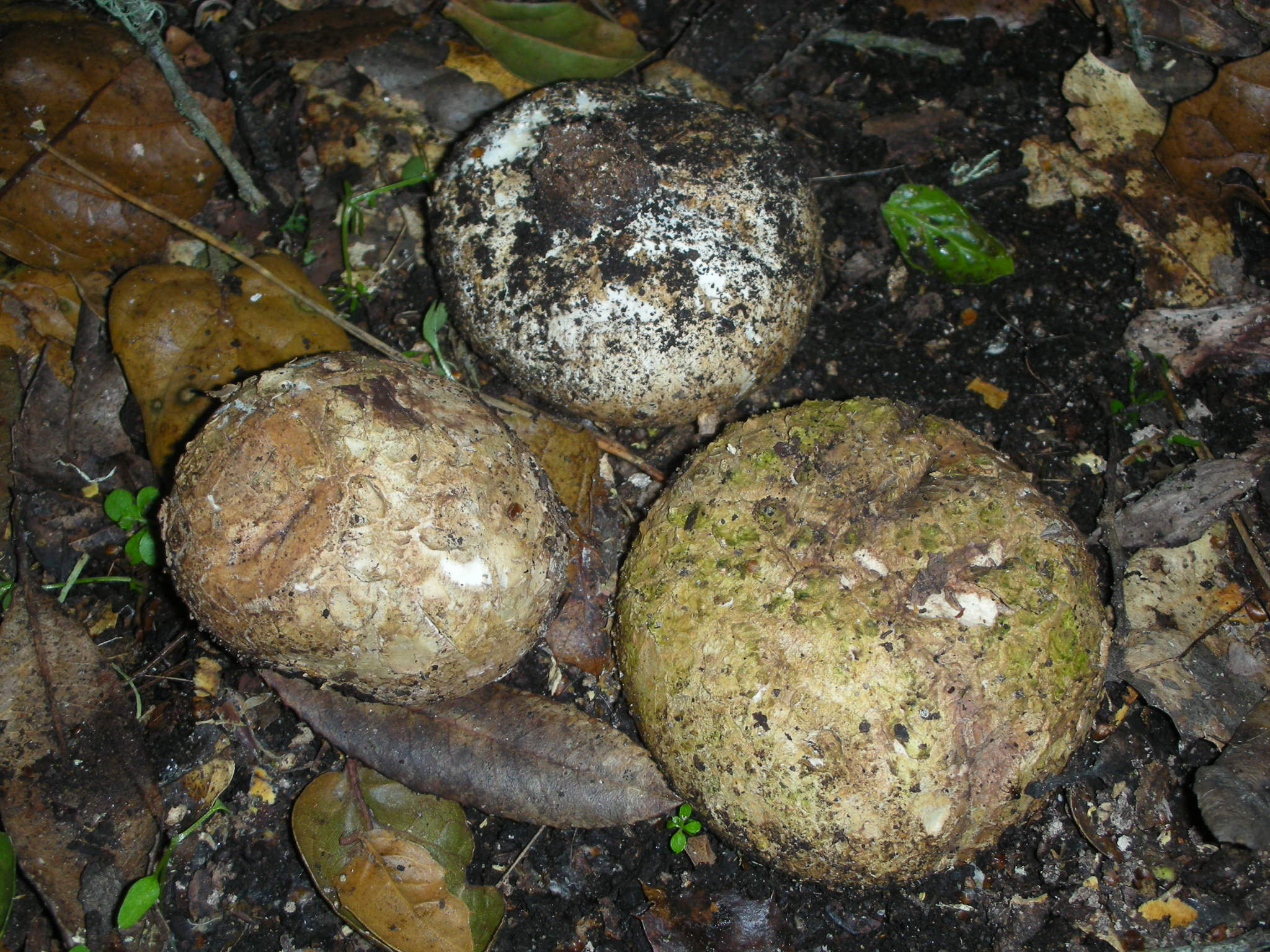
- Radiigera fuscogleba

Scientific classification
- Kingdom: Fungi
- Division: Basidiomycota
- Class: Agaricomycetes
- Order: Geastrales
- Family: Geastraceae
- Genus: Radiigera; Zeller (1944)

Type species
- Radiigera fuscogleba Zeller (1944)

Species
- R. bushnellii R. flexuosa R. fuscogleba R. taylorii

= Radiigera =

Genus of fungi

Radiigera is a genus of fungi in the family Geastraceae. The genus contain four widely distributed species.
