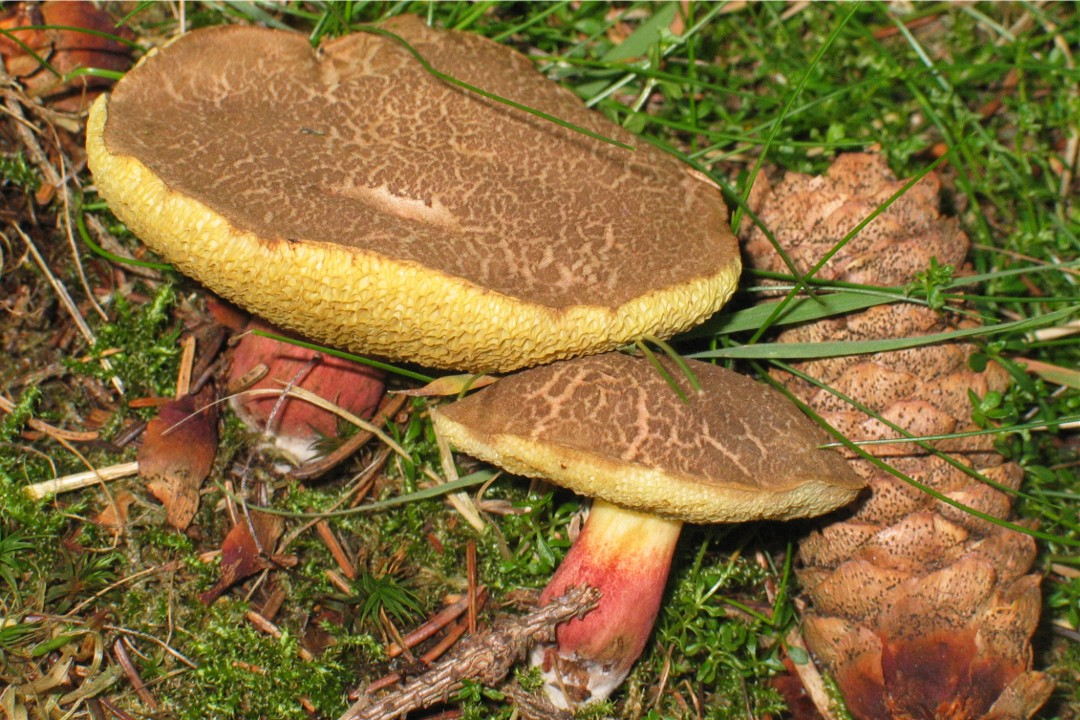
- Xerocomellus chrysenteron

Scientific classification
- Kingdom: Fungi
- Division: Basidiomycota
- Class: Agaricomycetes
- Order: Boletales
- Family: Boletaceae
- Genus: Xerocomellus; Šutara (2008)

Type species
- Xerocomellus chrysenteron (Bull.) Šutara (2008)

Species
- See text

= Xerocomellus =

Genus of fungi

Xerocomellus is a genus of fungi in the family Boletaceae. The genus, as it was described in 2008, contained 12 species. However X. rubellus and X. engelii were transferred to the new genus Hortiboletus and X. armeniacus was transferred to the new genus Rheubarbariboletus in 2015. Molecular analysis supports the distinction of Xerocomellus species from Boletus and Xerocomus, within which these species were formerly contained. Xerocomellus in fact is only distantly related to Xerocomus and is most closely related to Tylopilus, Boletus sensu stricto, Porphyrellus, Strobilomyces, and Xanthoconium.

== Taxonomy ==
Members of the genus had been classified either in the genus Boletus or Xerocomus until Czech mycologist Josef Šutara examined a number of species and concluded that there was a defined group containing X. chrysenteron, X. armeniacus and relatives that are distinct morphologically from the group containing Xerocomus subtomentosus and related species. He deferred fully delimiting the genus until genetic work confirmed their distinctness. Previously, Manfred Binder had coined the term Paraxerocomus for the group but this was not officially published.

The type species is the red-cracked bolete (Xerocomellus chrysenteron).

Genetic analysis published in 2013 showed that X. chrysenteron and X. zelleri form a Xerocomellus clade within a larger group informally called "anaxoboletus" in the Boletineae. It appears to have affinities with what was then known informally as the "rubellus clade", which contained the species X. rubellus and X. armeniacus, now known as Hortiboletus rubellus and Rheubarbariboletus armeniacus respectively. The same study found Xerocomellus to be more distantly to a 'badius' clade containing Boletus badius, now known as Imleria badia, and relatives. Other clades in the group include the porcini (true Boletus species) and Strobilomyces clades, species currently designated Xerocomus (the species are not true Xerocomus species), and smaller genera whose relationships are unclear.

== Description ==
Members of the genus have small to medium-size fruit bodies with more slender stipes compared with other boletes. They are often brightly coloured. The caps are dry and do not become sticky when wet. Their cuticle tissue is a palisadoderm, comprising parallel or roughly parallel hypha arranged in an anticlinal fashion. The palisoderm, which is generally between 120 and 350 μm thick (although extremes of 80 μm and 500 μm are known), maintains its characteristic arrangement for longer periods than other boletes. The tubes are generally yellow and adnate or slightly decurrent. The pores are also yellow and quite large, up to 2.5 mm in diameter each and angular in shape. The spores are generally spindle-shaped to oval and have a smooth or striate surface. The spore print is brown or slightly olive-tinged when fresh.

Morphological Features of Xerocomoid Boletes

	Boletus s.str.	Hemileccinum	Xerocomellus	Xerocomus s.str.
Spore surface	Smooth	Smooth	Longitudinally striated or smooth, never bacilate	Bacilate
Hymenophoral trama	Boletoid type with gelatinous lateral strata	Boletoid type with gelatinous lateral strata	Intermediate between boletoid and phylloporoid when fully developed with distinct but weakly gelatinous lateral strata	Phylloporoid type with nongelatinous lateral strata
Pileipellis	Trichoderm, sometimes collapsing, rarely ixotrichoderm or other	Initially trichoderm but collapses with age	Initially palisadoderm, typically encrusted	Initially a trichoderm, never encrusted
Lateral stipe stratum	Frequently gelatinous, 60–90 μm thick, thicker than that of Xerocomellus	Similar to that of Leccinum species, ornamented with stipe scabrousities up to 400–640 μm thick	Frequently not present, reduced to no more than 30–40 μm thick, not gelatinous	Lateral stipe stratum never gelatinous and 80–200 μm thick

== Ecology ==
Xerocomellus species form mycorrhizal associations with coniferous and deciduous trees.

== Species ==
Image	Scientific name	Taxon author	Year	Basionym	Distribution
	X. amylosporus	(A.H. Sm.) J.L. Frank & N. Siegel,	2020	Porphyrellus amylosporus A.H. Sm., (1965).	Vancouver Island, British Columbia, Canada, south into California
	X. atropurpureus	J.L. Frank, N. Siegel & C.F. Schwarz,	2020		British Columbia south at least to Monterey County, California along the coast, inland to the Sierra Nevada and Cascade Range
	X. behrii	(Harkn.) Castellano, M.E. Sm. & J.L. Frank	2018	Splanchnomyces behrii Harkn., (1884).	California and Oregon
	X. bolinii	J.A. Bolin, A.E. Bessette, A.R. Bessette, L.V. Kudzma, J.L. Frank & A. Farid	2021		Florida
	X. carmeniae	Garza-Ocañas, J. García & de la Fuente	2022		Mexico (Nuevo León)
	X. chrysenteron	(Bull.) Šutara	2008	Boletus chrysenteron Bull. (1791)	cosmopolitan
	X. cisalpinus	(Simonini, H.Ladurner & Peintner) Klofac	2011	Xerocomus cisalpinus Simonini, H. Ladurner & Peintner (2003)	mainland Europe and in North America.
	X. communis	Xue T. Zhu & Zhu L. Yang	2016		China (Yunnan)
	X. corneri	Xue T. Zhu & Zhu L. Yang	2016		China
	X. diffractus	N. Siegel, C.F. Schwarz, & J.L. Frank	2020		central California, through the Pacific Northwest into British Columbia, Canada, east to the Rocky Mountains of Wyoming, and south into Arizona
	X. dryophilus	(Thiers) N. Siegel, C.F. Schwarz & J.L. Frank	2014	Boletus dryophilus Thiers	North America
	X. fennicus	(Harmaja) Šutara	2008	Boletellus fennicus Harmaja (1999)	Austria, Czech Republic, Denmark, Finland and Sweden, possibly also Belgium
	X. fulvus	Sarwar, I. Ahmad & Khalid	2016		Pakistan
	X. himalayanus	D. Chakr and A. Ghosh	2023		India (Himachal Pradesh)
	X. intermedius	(A.H. Sm. & Thiers) Svetash., Simonini & Vizzini	2016	Boletellus intermedius A.H.Sm. & Thiers (1971)	Northeastern United States
	X. macmurphyi	(Zeller & C.W. Dodge) Castellano, Saylor, M.E. Sm., & J.L. Frank	2018	Hymenogaster macmurphyi Zeller & C.W. Dodge, 1934.	California and Oregon
	X. marekii	(Šutara & Skála) Šutara	2008	Boletus marekii Šutara & Skála (2007)	Czech Republic and Hungary
	X. mendocinensis	(Thiers) N. Siegel, C.F. Schwarz & J.L. Frank	2020	Boletus truncatus (Singer, Snell, & Dick) Pouzar	Western United States
	X. perezmorenoi	Ayala-Vasquez & M. Martinez-Reyes	2023		Mexico
	X. poederi	G. Moreno, Heykoop, Esteve-Rav., P. Alvarado & Traba	2016		Europe
	X. porosporus	(Imler ex G.Moreno & Bon) Šutara	2008	Boletus porosporus Imler ex Bon & G.Moreno (1977)	Europe
	X. pruinatus	(Fr. & Hök) Šutara	2008	Boletus pruinatus Fr. & Hök (1835)	Europe
	X. rainisiae	(Bessette & O.K. Mill.) N. Siegel, C.F. Schwarz & J.L. Frank	2014	Boletus rainisiae Bessette & O.K. Mill. [as “rainisii”], in Bessette et al., 2000.	Vancouver Island, British Columbia, Canada, south into Oregon.
	X. redeuilhii	A.F.S. Taylor, U. Eberh., Simonini, Gelardi & Vizzini	2016	Boletus dryophilus Simonini, (1994) Xerocomus dryophilus Ladurner & Simonini (2003)	Europe
	X. ripariellus	(Redeuilh) Šutara	2008	Xerocomus ripariellus Redeuilh (1997)	Europe
	X. salicicola	C.F. Schwarz, N. Siegel & J.L. Frank	2020	Xerocomus salicicola C.F. Schwarz, N. Siegel & J.L. Frank (2020)	Western North America
	X. sarnarii	Simonini, Vizzini & Eberhardt	2015		Italy, France
	X. truncatus	(Singer, Snell & E.A.Dick) Klofac	2011	Xerocomus truncatus Singer, Snell & E.A.Dick (1959)	Eastern North America
	X. zelleri	(Murrill) Klofac 2011	2011	Ceriomyces zelleri Murrill (1912)	Northwestern North America
