= Fungal fruit body lectin family =

Fungal fruit body lectin
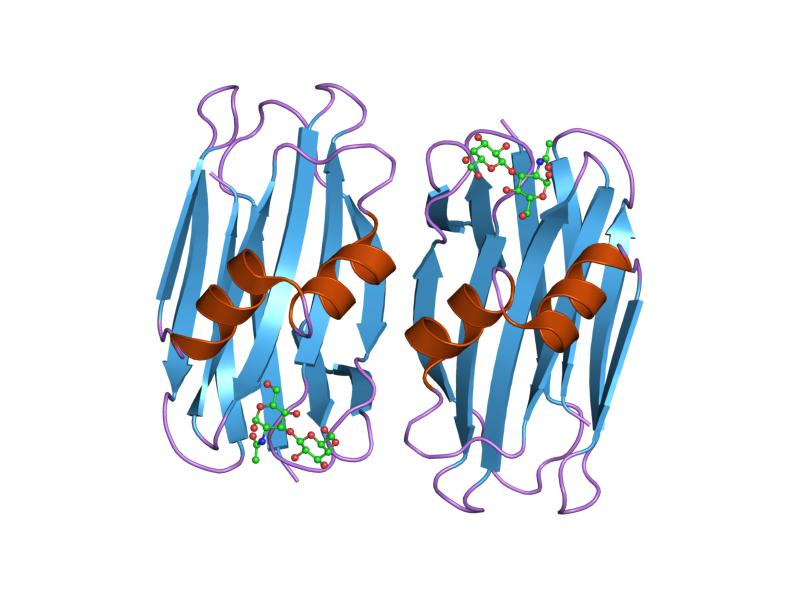
- crystal structure of the common edible mushroom (Agaricus bisporus) lectin in complex with lacto-N-biose

Identifiers
- Symbol: FB_lectin
- Pfam: PF07367
- InterPro: IPR009960
Available protein structures:
- PDB: IPR009960 PF07367 (ECOD; PDBsum)
- AlphaFold: IPR009960; PF07367

In molecular biology, the fungal fruit body lectin family consists of several fungal fruit body lectin proteins. Fruit body lectins are thought to have insecticidal activity and may also function in capturing nematodes. One member of this family, the lectin XCL from Boletus chrysenteron (formerly Xerocomus chrysenteron), induces drastic changes in the actin cytoskeleton after sugar binding at the cell surface and internalisation, and has potent insecticidal activity. The fold of lectin XCL is not related to any of several other lectin folds, but shows significant structural similarity to cytolysins.
