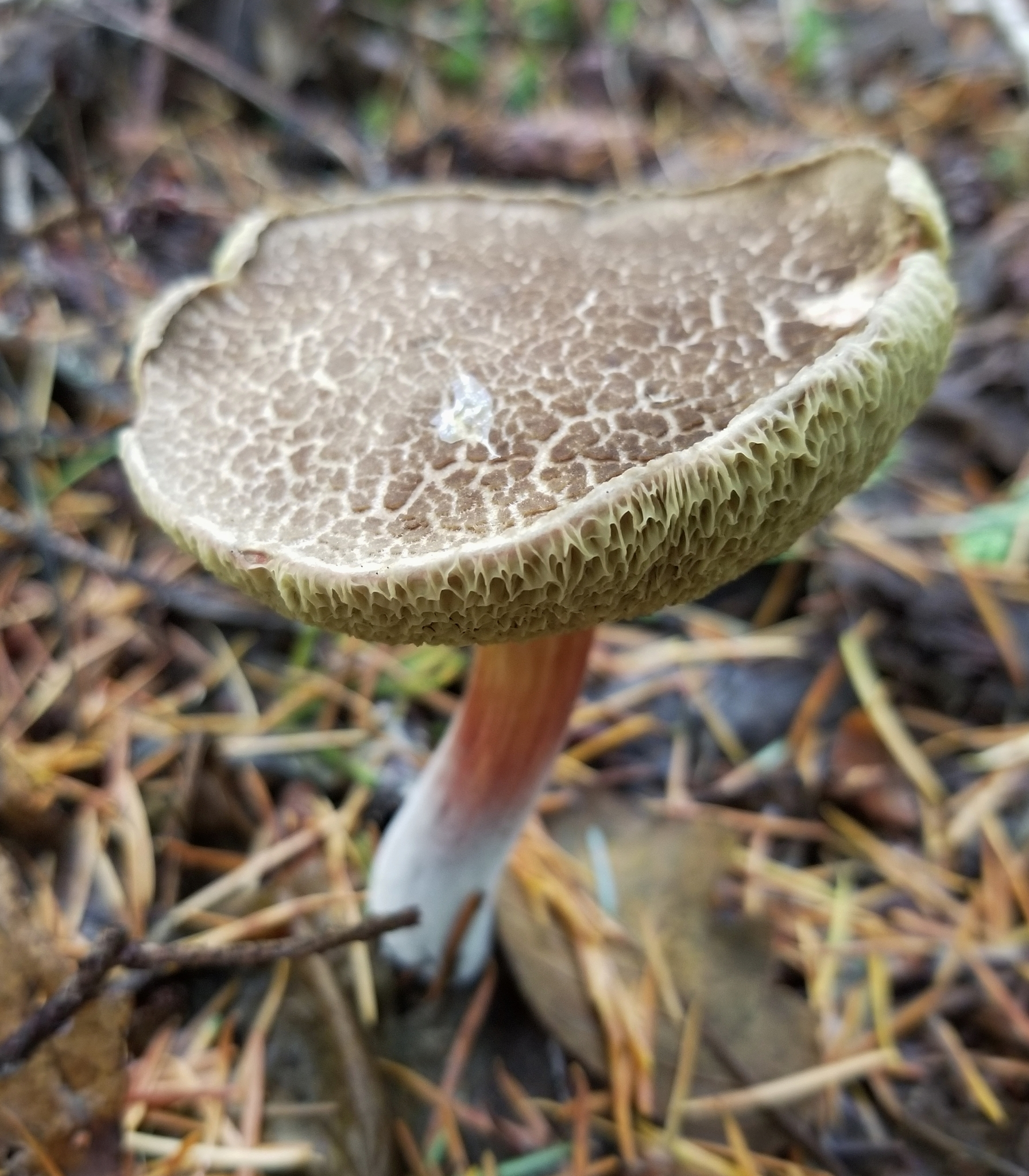

Scientific classification
- Kingdom: Fungi
- Division: Basidiomycota
- Class: Agaricomycetes
- Order: Boletales
- Family: Boletaceae
- Genus: Xerocomellus
- Species: X. diffractus

Binomial name
- Xerocomellus diffractus N. Siegel, C.F. Schwartz, J.L. Frank

= Xerocomellus diffractus =

Species of mushroom

Xerocomellus diffractus
- Mycological characteristics
- Pores on hymenium
- Cap is convex or flat
- Stipe is bare
- Spore print is olive-brown
- Ecology is mycorrhizal
- Edibility is edible

Xerocomellus diffractus, commonly known as the cracked-cap bolete, is a species of mushroom in the family Boletaceae. It is found in western North America.

== Taxonomy ==
Xerocomellus diffractus was first unofficially described by Noah Siegel, Christian Schwarz, and Jonathan L. Frank in the book Mushrooms of the Redwood Coast in 2016. Back then, the name was provisional. It was later formally described by Frank as a separate species in 2020.

== Description ==
The cap is brownish and 3.5–9 centimetres (1 1/2–3 1/2 in) wide. It develops cracks as it gets older. The cracks start out pale to whitish, and turn pinkish as the mushroom gets older. The stipe is 4–9 cm (1 1/2–3 1/2 in) tall and 7–18 millimetres (1/4–3/4 in) wide. The flesh is whitish in the cap, yellow in the stem, and stains blue. The spore print is olive brown.

Xerocomellus diffractus sometimes slowly bruises blue.

=== Similar species ===
Xerocomellus diffractus can be confused with several other species of mushrooms, including X. amylosporus, X. mendocinensis, X. salicola, X. rainisiae, and X. chrysenteron. However, X. amylosporus, X. mendocinensis, X. salicola, and X. rasisiae bruise blue quicker and more intensely, and X. chrysenteron is found in Europe.

== Habitat and ecology ==
Xerocomellus diffractus is a mycorrhizal fungus, found growing under trees. Grow solitary or scattered in troops under both conifers and hardwoods. Fruiting in fall and early winter, or occasionally in spring on the California and Oregon coast, and summer in the Southwest, and at higher elevations.

== See also ==
- List of North American Boletes
