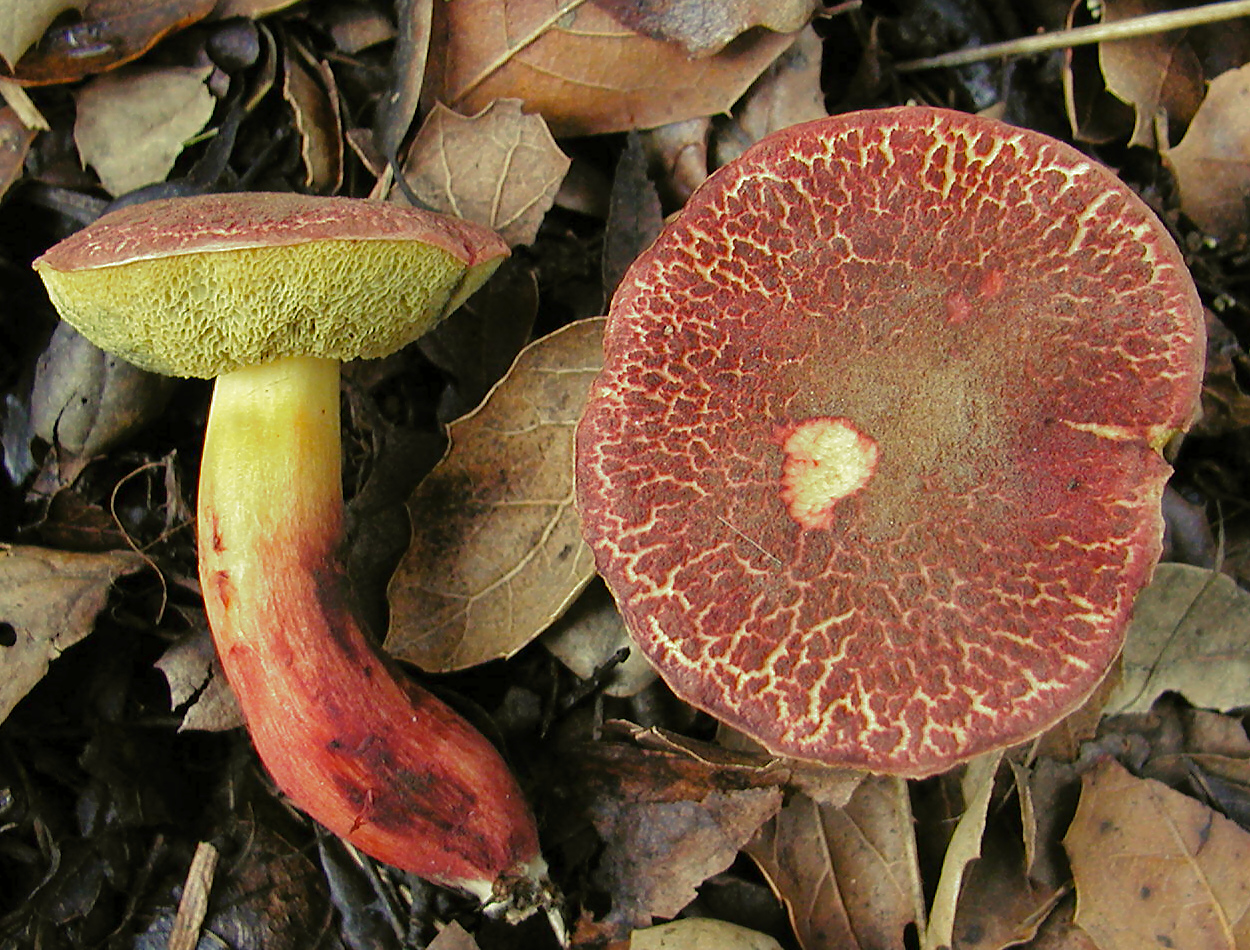

Scientific classification
- Kingdom: Fungi
- Division: Basidiomycota
- Class: Agaricomycetes
- Order: Boletales
- Family: Boletaceae
- Genus: Xerocomellus
- Species: X. dryophilus

Binomial name
- Xerocomellus dryophilus (Thiers) N. Siegel, C.F. Schwarz & J.L. Frank (2014)

= Xerocomellus dryophilus =

Species of fungus

Xerocomellus dryophilus
- Mycological characteristics
- Pores on hymenium
- Cap is convex or flat
- Stipe is bare
- Spore print is brown to olive-brown
- Edibility is edible

Xerocomellus dryophilus, commonly known as the oak-loving bolete and formerly known as Boletus dryophilus or Xerocomus dryophilus, is a basidiomycete fungus in the family Boletaceae. It was transferred to the new genus Xerocomellus in 2014. Its epithet had been previously applied to a European species, now described as Xerocomellus redeuilhii.

The reddish cap is up to 10 centimetres (4 in) wide and convex to plane. The pores are yellowish and often bruise blue, as does the flesh. The spore print is brown. The stem is up to 12 cm long, yellow at the top and reddish below. It is similar to X. chrysenteron and Boletus smithii.

The species appears to only occur under Quercus agrifolia (coast live oak) and is only found in California, where it is one of the most common boletes in the Los Angeles and San Diego counties. It is commonly parasitized by Hypomyces chrysospermus. It is edible but may be mediocre.
