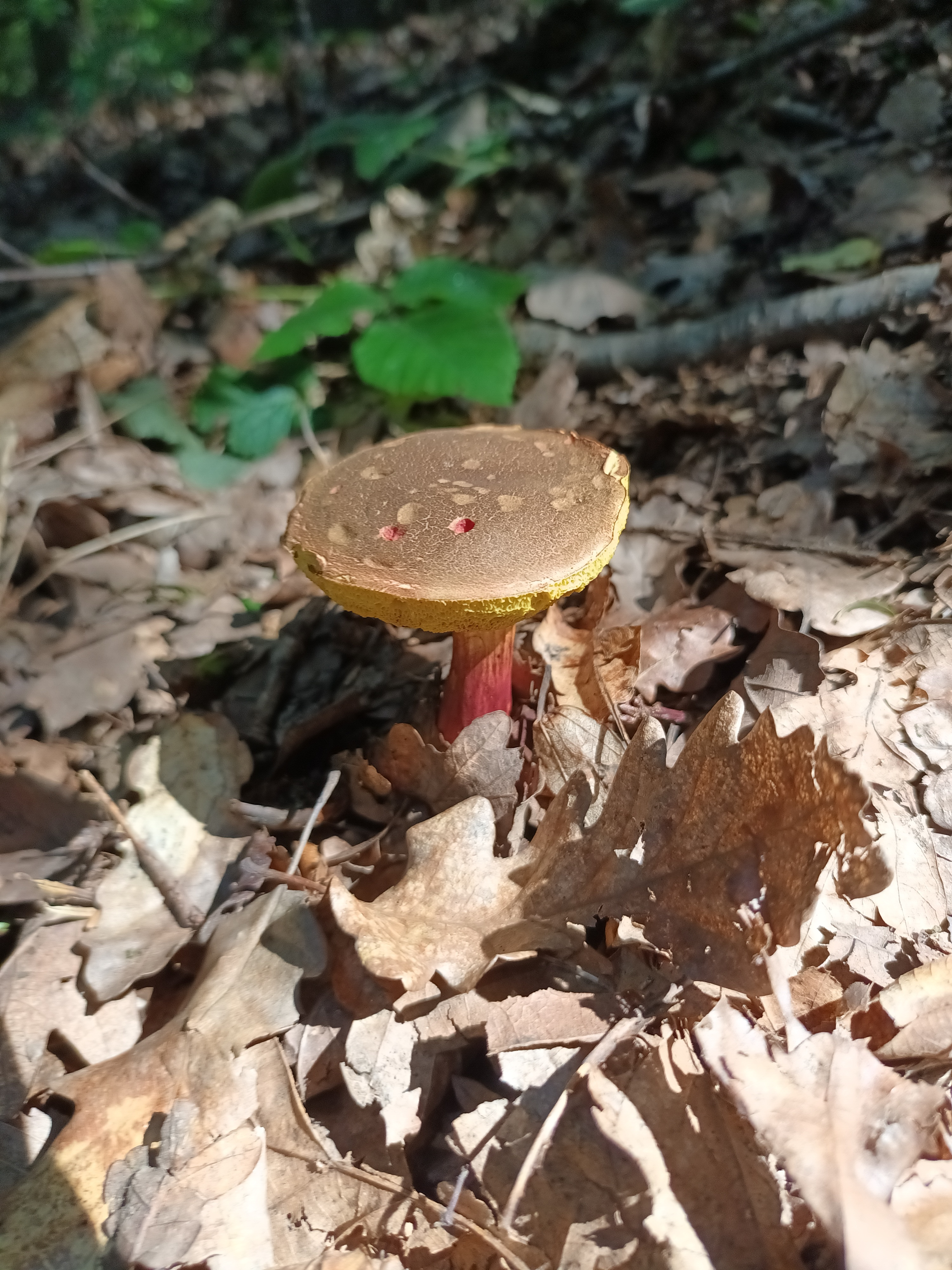

Scientific classification
- Kingdom: Fungi
- Division: Basidiomycota
- Class: Agaricomycetes
- Order: Boletales
- Family: Boletaceae
- Genus: Xerocomellus
- Species: X. chrysenteron

Binomial name
- Xerocomellus chrysenteron (Bull.) Šutara (2008)

Synonyms
- Boletus chrysenteron Bull. (1789); Xerocomus chrysenteron Quél. Boletus pascuus (Pers.) Krombh.

= Xerocomellus chrysenteron =

Xerocomellus chrysenteron
- Mycological characteristics
- Pores on hymenium
- Cap is convex or flat
- Hymenium attachment is irregular or not applicable
- Stipe is bare
- Spore print is olive-brown
- Ecology is mycorrhizal
- Edibility is edible

Xerocomellus chrysenteron, formerly known as Boletus chrysenteron or Xerocomus chrysenteron and commonly known as the red cracking bolete, is a species of fungus in the family Boletaceae. The small mushroom has tubes and pores instead of gills beneath their caps. It is edible but not choice.

== Taxonomy ==
This mushroom was first described and named as Boletus communis in 1789 by the eminent French botanist Jean Baptiste Francois Pierre Bulliard. Two years later, in 1791, it was given the specific epithet chrysenteron by the same author, the species name coming from the Ancient Greek words khrysos "gold" and enteron "innards". In 1888, Lucien Quelet placed it in the new genus Xerocomus, retaining the chrysenteron epithet. This binomial was generally accepted until 1985 when Marcel Bon decided to resurrect the former specific epithet communis, which resulted in the binomial Xerocomus communis. While it recently resided back in the genus Boletus, as B. chrysenteron Bull., recent phylogenetic analysis supports its placement as the type species of the new genus Xerocomellus, described by Šutara in 2008.

== Description ==
Young specimens often have a dark, dry surface, and tomentose caps. When fully expanded, the brownish cap ranges from 4 to 10 cm (1 1/2 to 4 in) in diameter with very little substance and thin flesh that turns a blue color when slightly cut or bruised. The caps mature to convex and plane in old age. Cracks in the mature cap reveal a thin layer of light red flesh below the skin.

The 1 to 2 cm-diameter stems have no ring, are mostly bright yellow and the lower part is covered in coral-red fibrils and has a constant elliptical to fusiform diameter throughout its length of 4 to 13 cm. The cream-colored stem flesh turns blue when cut. The species has large, yellow, angular pores, and produces an olive brown spore print.

=== Similar species ===
Xerocomellus chrysenteron cannot be identified with certainty without the aid of a microscope, as many intermediate forms occur between it and other taxa, in particular, some forms of Xerocomellus pruinatus and Hortiboletus rubellus. X. porosporus is also similar to this species, but it is easily separated on account of the whitish under layer and truncate (chopped off) spores. This species is also easily confused with X. cisalpinus, Hortiboletus engelii, X. dryophilus, Aureoboletus mirabilis, and X. zelleri. The caps are similar to Imleria badia, the bay bolete.

== Distribution and habitat ==
Xerocomellus chrysenteron grows singly or in small groups in hardwood/conifer woods from early summer to mid-winter. It is mycorrhizal with hardwood trees, often beech on well-drained soils. It is frequent in parts of the northern temperate zones. The species has been recorded in Taiwan. It has been introduced to New Zealand, where it grows in groups under introduced deciduous trees.

This species may not be as common as once thought, having been often mistaken for the recently recognised X. cisalpinus.

== Ecology ==
The fruit bodies of X. chrysenteron are prone to infestation by the bolete eater (Hypomyces chrysospermus).

== Edibility ==
Xerocomellus chrysenteron is considered edible but not desirable due to bland flavor and soft texture. The pores are recommended to be removed immediately after mushrooms are picked as they rapidly decay. Young fungi are palatable and suitable for drying, but they become slimy when cooked; mature specimens are rather tasteless and decay quickly.

== Gallery ==
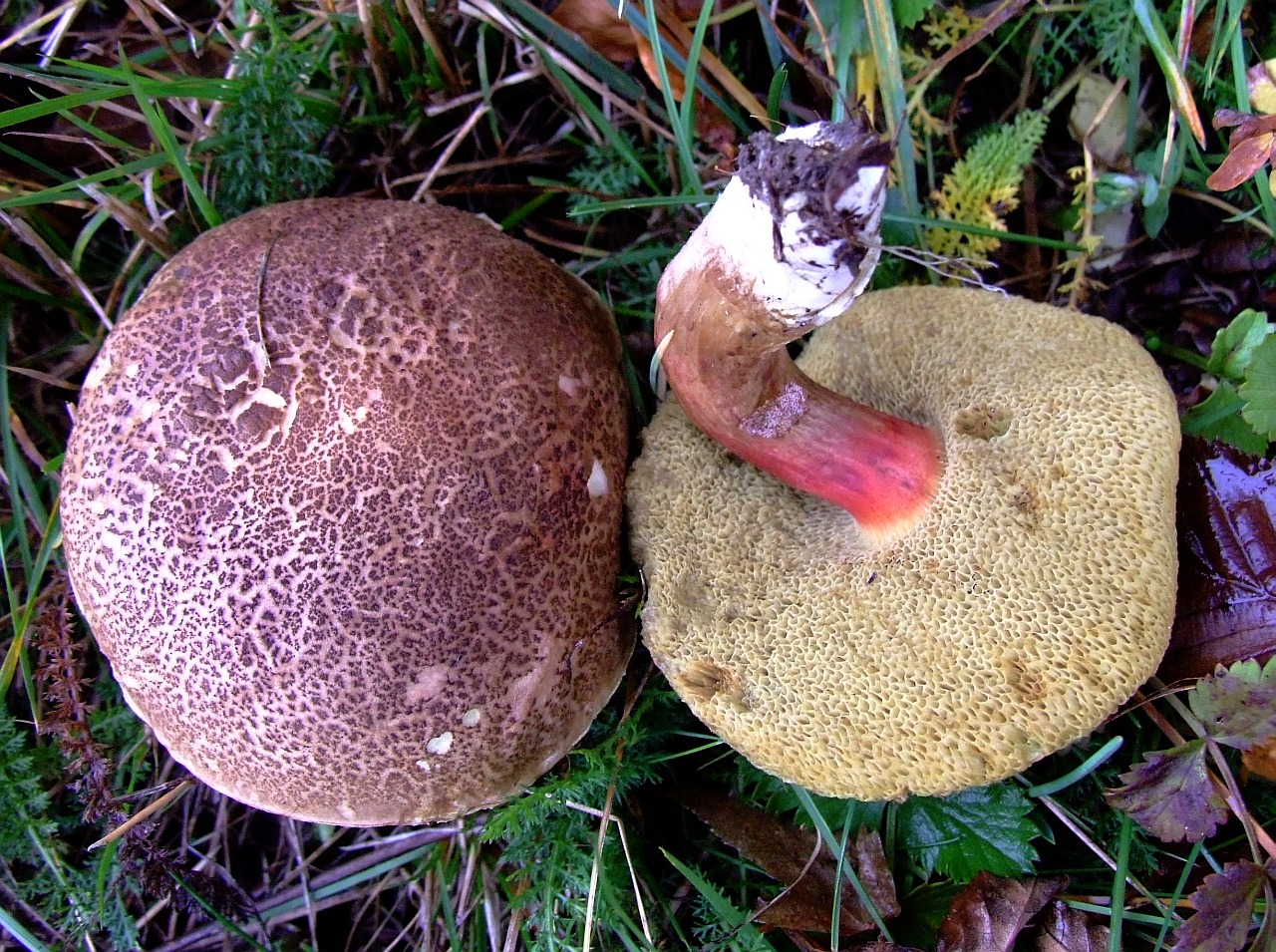
Maturing specimens

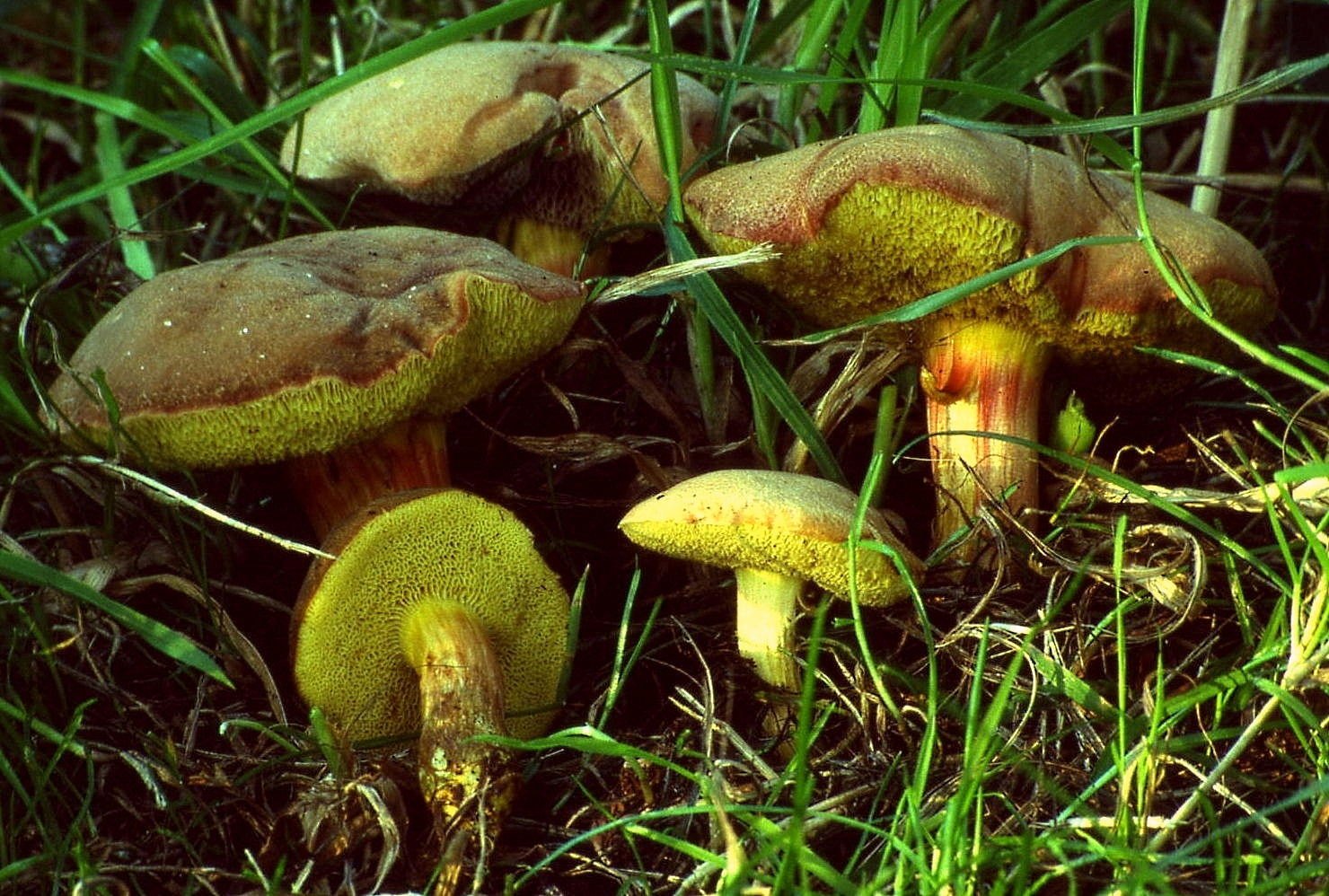
Specimens with large yellow pores

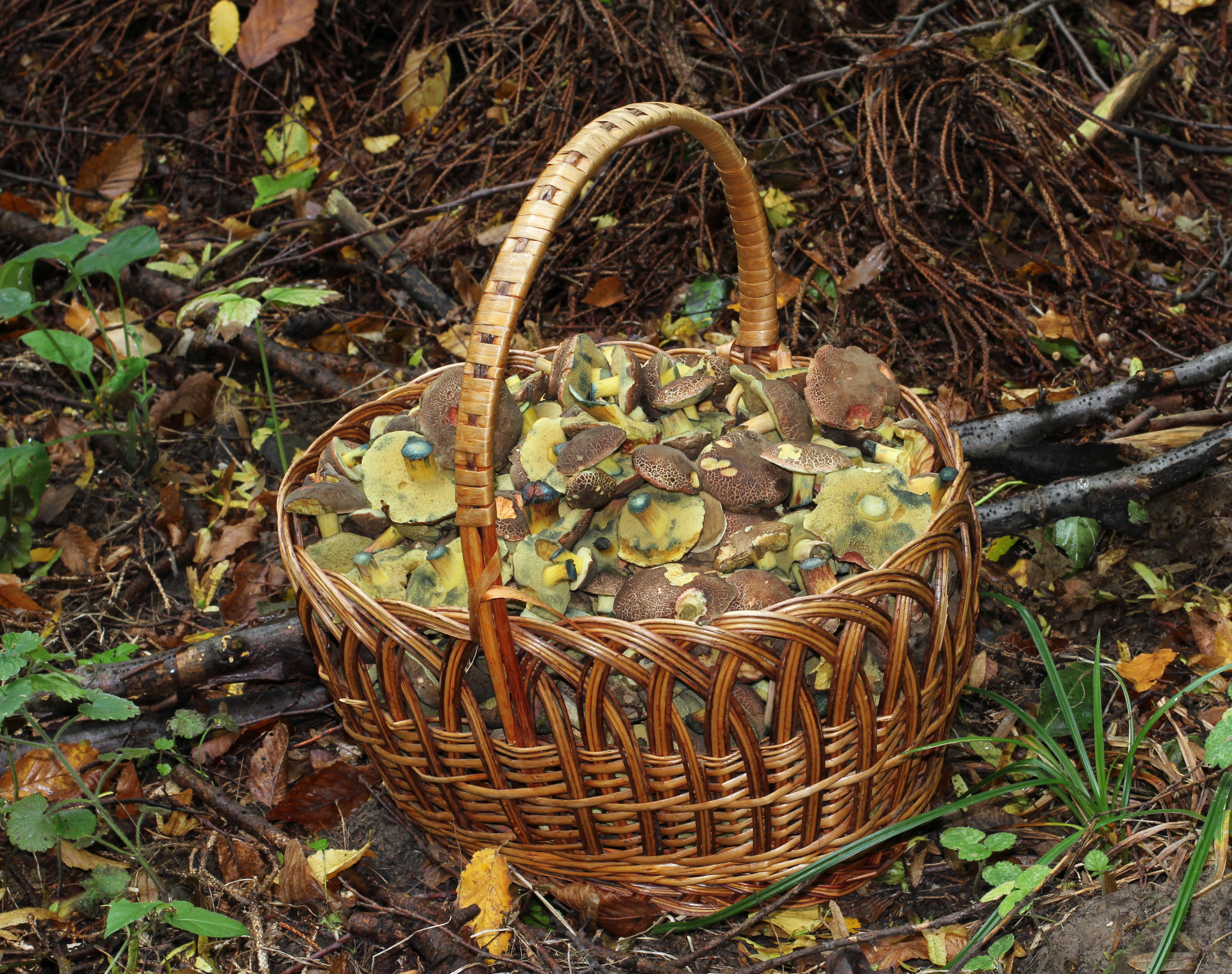
Picked mushrooms in basket

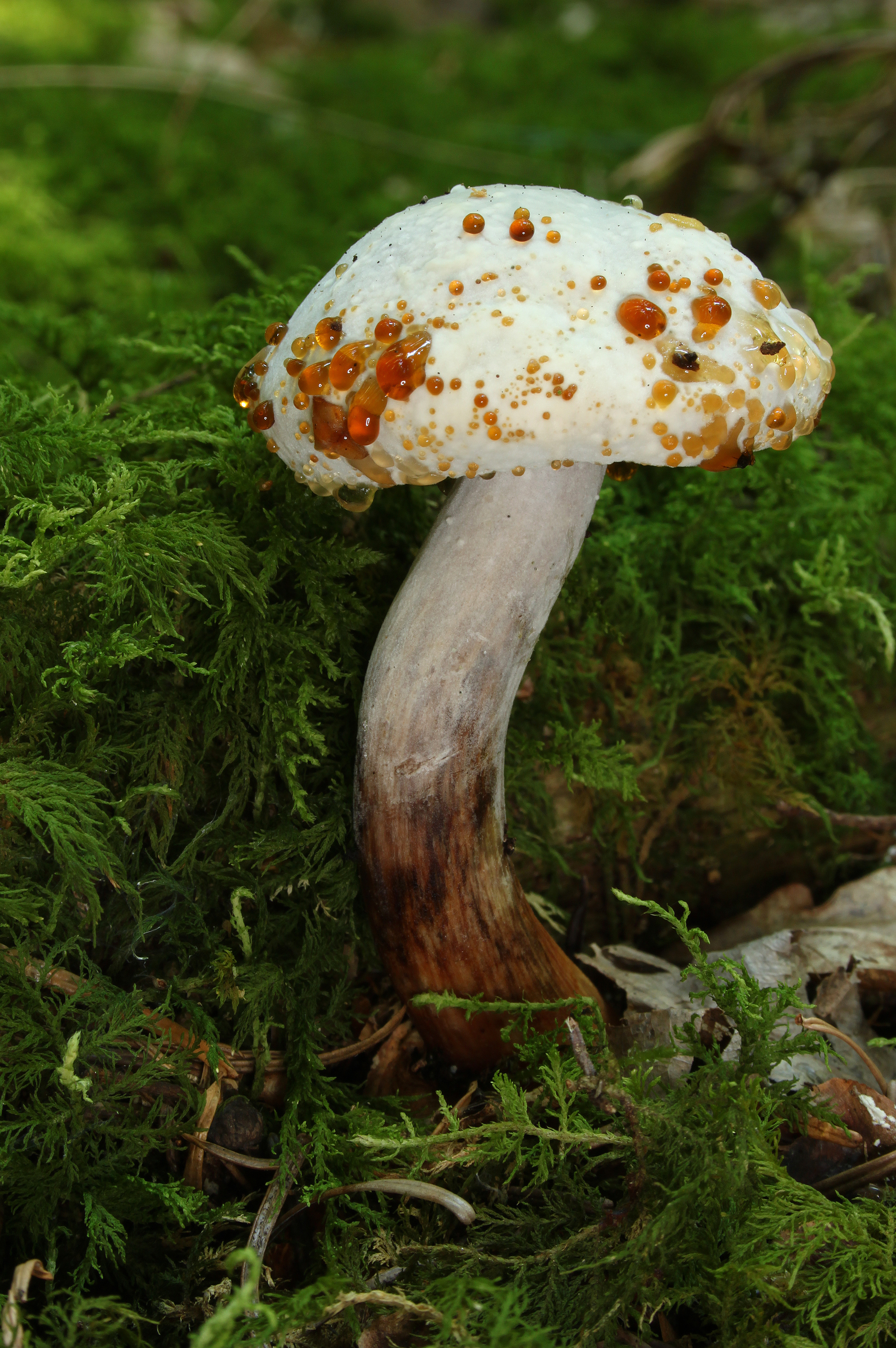
Mold growing on old specimen

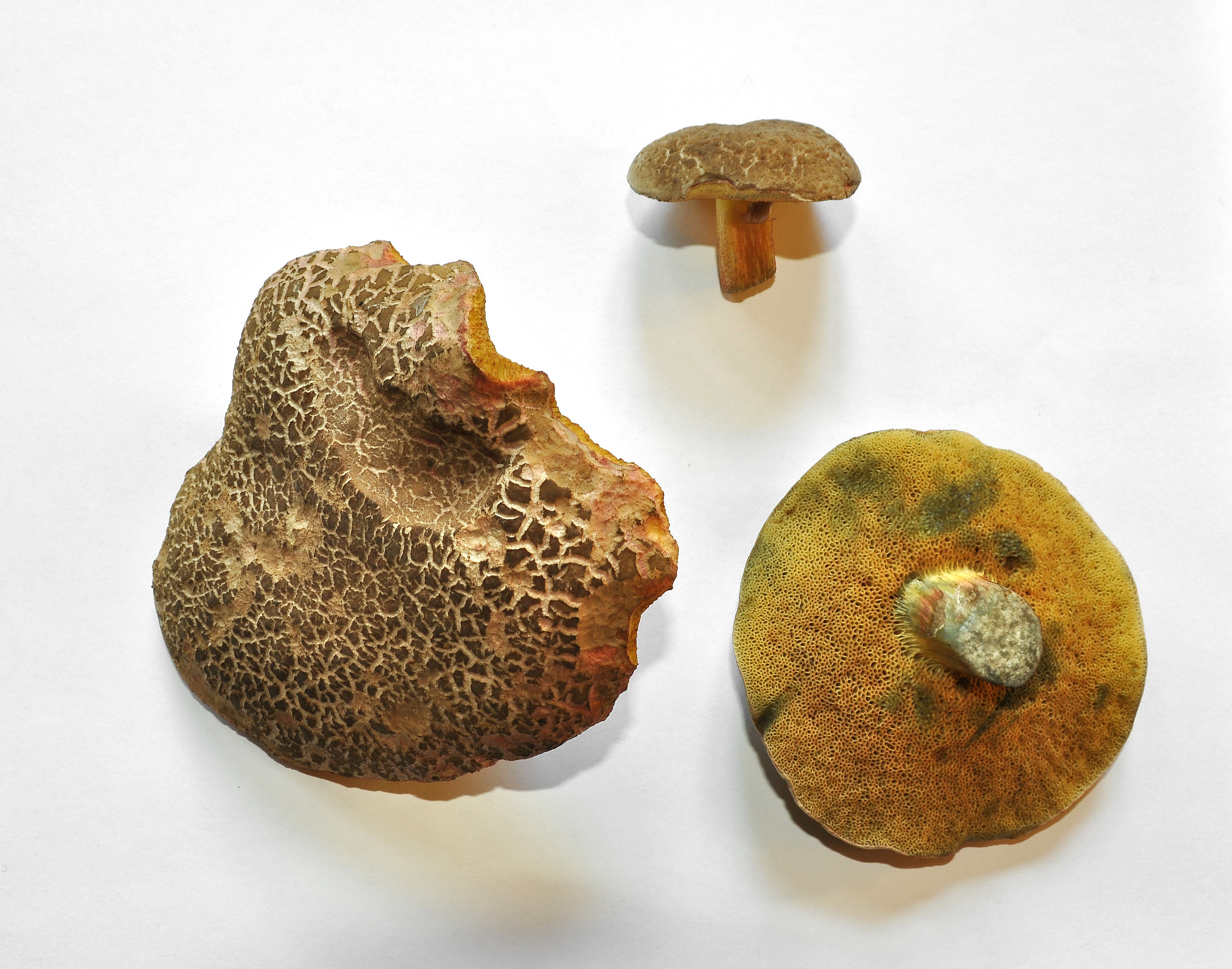
Mature picked specimens

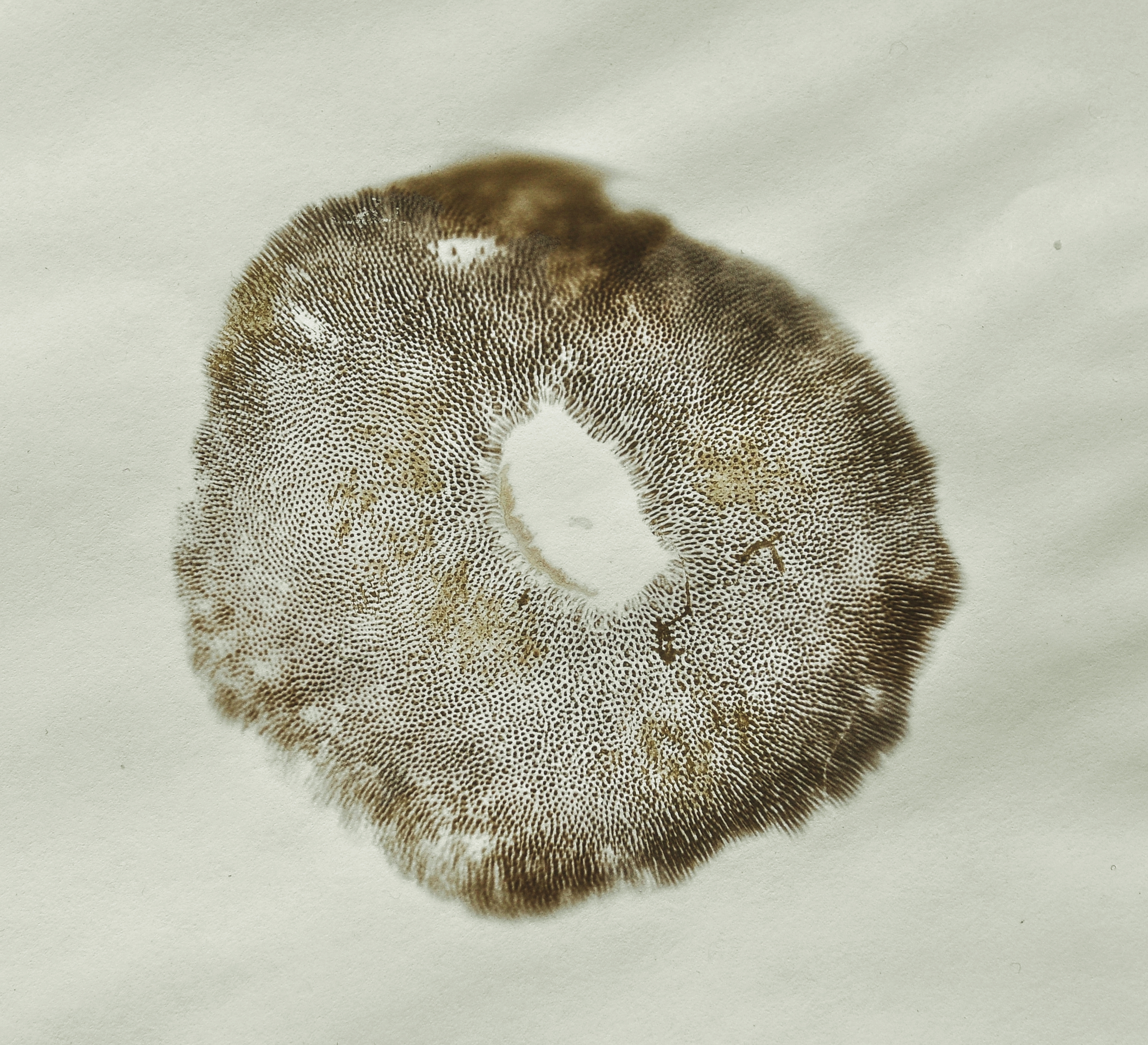
Spore print

== See also ==
- List of North American boletes
