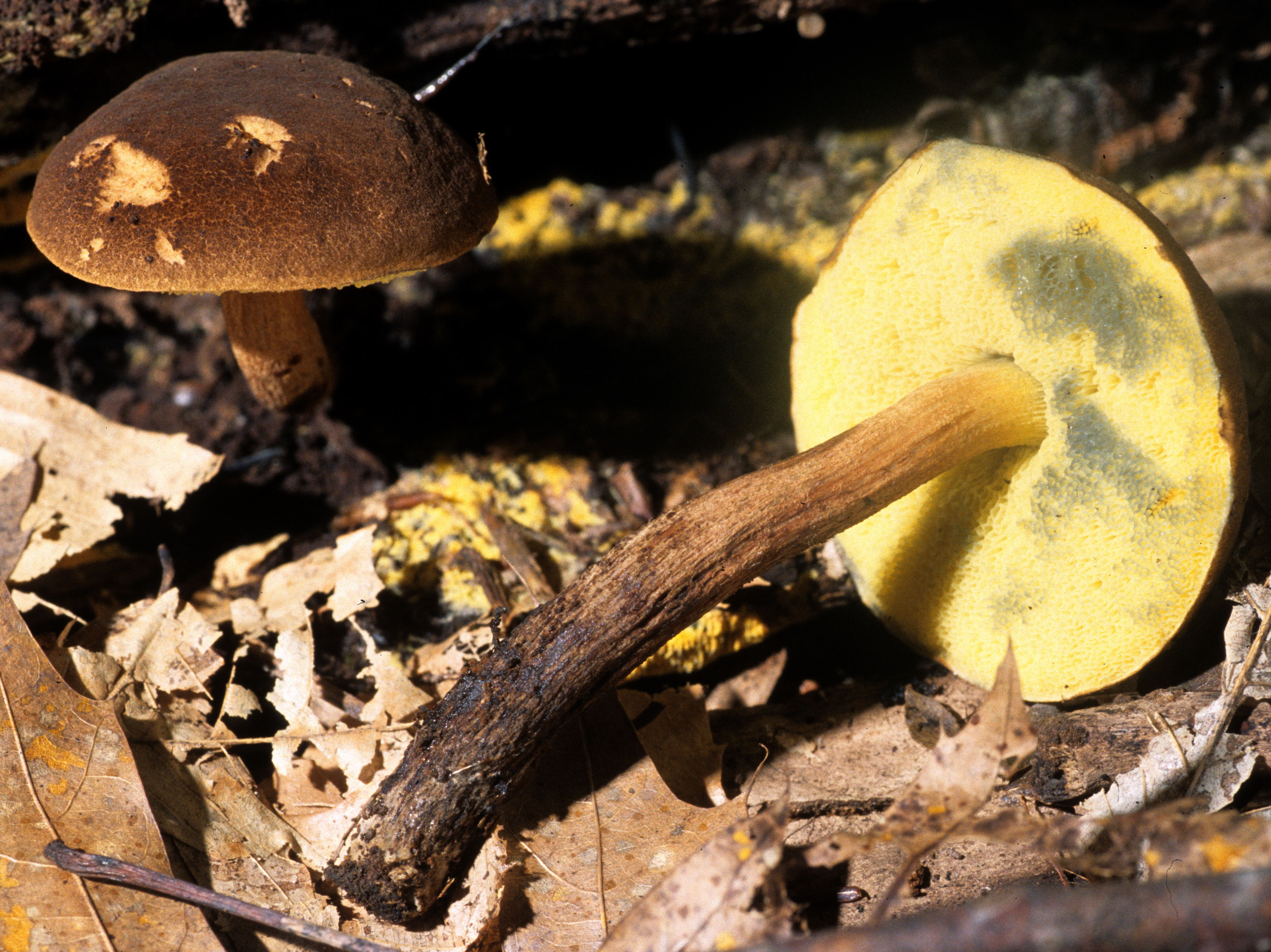

Scientific classification
- Domain: Eukaryota
- Kingdom: Fungi
- Division: Basidiomycota
- Class: Agaricomycetes
- Order: Boletales
- Family: Boletaceae
- Genus: Boletellus
- Species: B. chrysenteroides

Binomial name
- Boletellus chrysenteroides (Snell) Snell (1941)

Synonyms
- Boletus chrysenteroides Snell (1936)

= Boletellus chrysenteroides =

Species of fungus

Boletellus chrysenteroides is a species of fungus in the family Boletaceae.

== Taxonomy ==
It was first described as Boletus chrysenteroides by mycologist Wally Snell in 1936. Snell later (1941) transferred the species to Boletellus.

Its specific epithet refers to its similarity to Xerocomellus chrysenteron.

== Description ==
The brown cap is 2–7 centimetres (3/4–2 3/4 in) wide. The yellow, sunken pores are 1 millimetre wide and stain blue. The stem is 3.5–10 cm (1 1/2–4 in) long and 6–12 mm (1/4–1/2 in) wide. The flesh is whitish, staining blue. The spore print is olive-brown.

=== Similar species ===
It is similar to Xerocomellus species, including X. chrysenteron.

== Distribution and habitat ==
It can be found in eastern North America from June to September. It prefers rotting wood, near oak or hemlock.

== See also ==
- List of North American boletes
