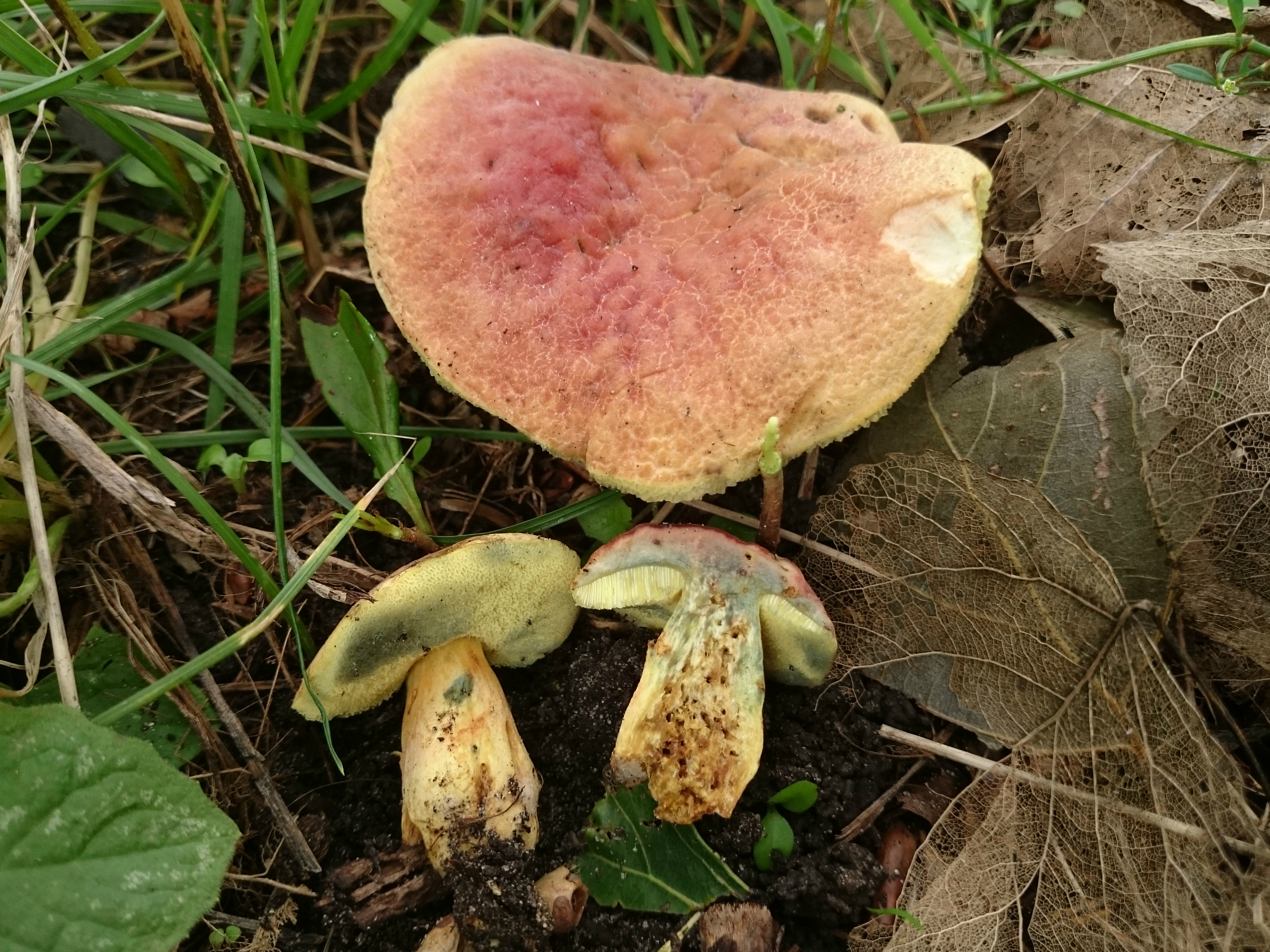

Scientific classification
- Domain: Eukaryota
- Kingdom: Fungi
- Division: Basidiomycota
- Class: Agaricomycetes
- Order: Boletales
- Family: Boletaceae
- Genus: Hortiboletus
- Species: H. bubalinus

Binomial name
- Hortiboletus bubalinus (Oolbekk. & Duin) Dima (2014)

Synonyms
- Boletus bubalinus Oolbekk. & Duin (1991); Xerocomus bubalinus (Oolbekk. & Duin) Redeuilh (1993)

= Hortiboletus bubalinus =

Species of fungus

Hortiboletus bubalinus is a species of bolete fungus in the family Boletaceae. Originally described in 1991 as a species of Boletus, the fungus was transferred to Xerocomus in 1993. It was transferred to Hortiboletus by Bálint Dima in 2015.
