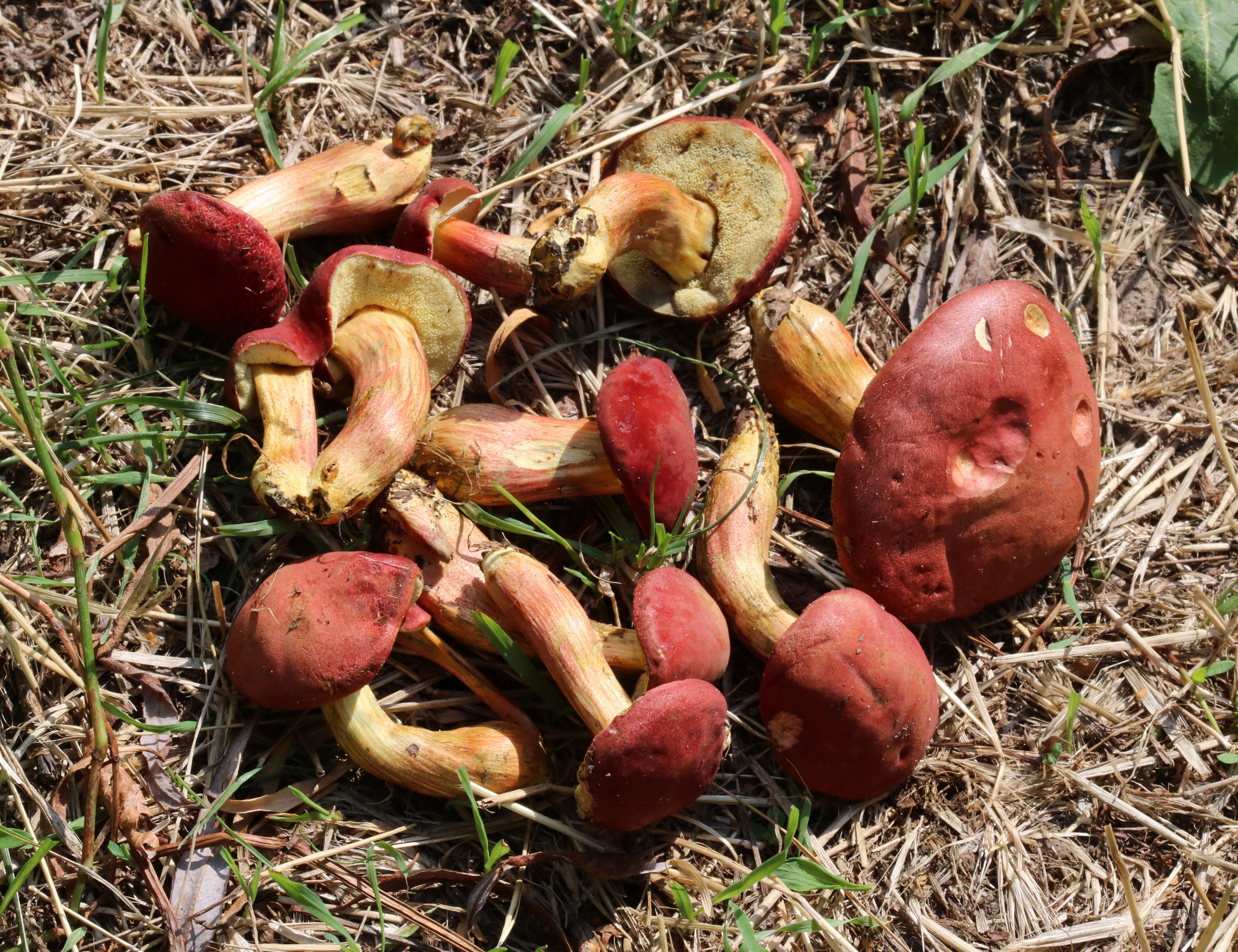

Scientific classification
- Kingdom: Fungi
- Division: Basidiomycota
- Class: Agaricomycetes
- Order: Boletales
- Family: Boletaceae
- Genus: Hortiboletus
- Species: H. rubellus

Binomial name
- Hortiboletus rubellus (Krombh.) Simonini, Vizzini & Gelardi (2015)

Synonyms
- Boletus rubellus Krombh. (1836); Boletus versicolor Rostk. (1844); Xerocomus rubellus (Krombh.) Quel. (1896); Suillus rubellus (Krombh.) Kuntze (1898); Tubiporus rubellus (Krombh.) S.Imai (1968); Xerocomellus rubellus (Krombh.) Šutara (2008)

= Hortiboletus rubellus =

Species of fungus

Hortiboletus rubellus
- Mycological characteristics
- Pores on hymenium
- Cap is convex or flat
- Hymenium is adnate
- Stipe is bare
- Spore print is olive to brown
- Edibility is edible but not recommended

Hortiboletus rubellus, commonly known as the ruby bolete, is a small, dainty, brightly coloured member of the family Boletaceae, with a reddish cap and stipe, and yellow pores. Like many boletes, it stains blue when cut or bruised. It is found in deciduous woodland in autumn. There is some question over its edibility, and it is reportedly of poor quality with a taste of soap. Until 2015, the species was known as Boletus rubellus.

== Taxonomy ==
Boletus rubellus was one of the pored basidiomycetes to be placed in the genus Xerocomus in the past, and is still regarded as such in some texts. The previously commonly used binomial name Boletus versicolor (Rostk.), published in 1844, is now reduced to synonymy as it postdates the current name by German mycologist Julius Vincenz von Krombholz which dates from 1836. Its present specific epithet rubellus is Latin for "somewhat red". The fungus was transferred to the new genus Hortiboletus in 2015, following molecular evidence indicating its genetic dissimilarity to Boletus.

== Description ==
It is a small bolete, with the cap being rarely over 6 centimetres (2 3/8 in) in diameter. This cap is scarlet to raspberry red when young, with a dry velvety texture, often cracking in age. The extreme margin often has a pale yellow or white band around it, and it discolours darker and dirtier with age. The pores are small; pale yellow, and bruise slowly. Sometimes tapering, the stem is slender and long, and may reach 7.5 cm (3 in). It is lemon yellow at the apex, but red elsewhere, and has a tendency to split or sheer vertically. The flesh is straw-coloured in the cap, and stains slowly blue over the tubes when cut. The flesh of the stem is pale yellow at the apex and yellow further down. At the stem base, the flesh may have a distinct spot of brick-red or orange. The tubes and pores are large and lemon-yellow, and may be greenish tinged when older. The spore print is olive. It smells pleasant, but indistinct, and is said to taste slightly soapy.

Conflicting information on pore size in notable publications is a possible indication that there may be more than one species involved, both in Britain and in North America.

== Distribution and habitat ==
Uncommon to rare in Southern England, occurring largely with oak (Quercus). It also appears in Europe, and the Eastern United States and Canada. A similar species noted as "cf versicolor" has been collected from Victoria in southeastern Australia.

== Edibility ==
The species is edible, but often maggoty, and some sources describe the taste as soapy.

== Similar species ==
Baorangia bicolor is almost identical, and Boletus campestris is very similar.

In Europe, this species is often mistaken for the similar Xerocomus armeniacus due to similar dry and velvety pileus, but does not show the same red coloration in the stem base. Other similar species include Xerocomellus chrysenteron, X. mendocinensis, Hortiboletus coccyginus, and Boletus fraternus.

== See also ==
- List of North American boletes
