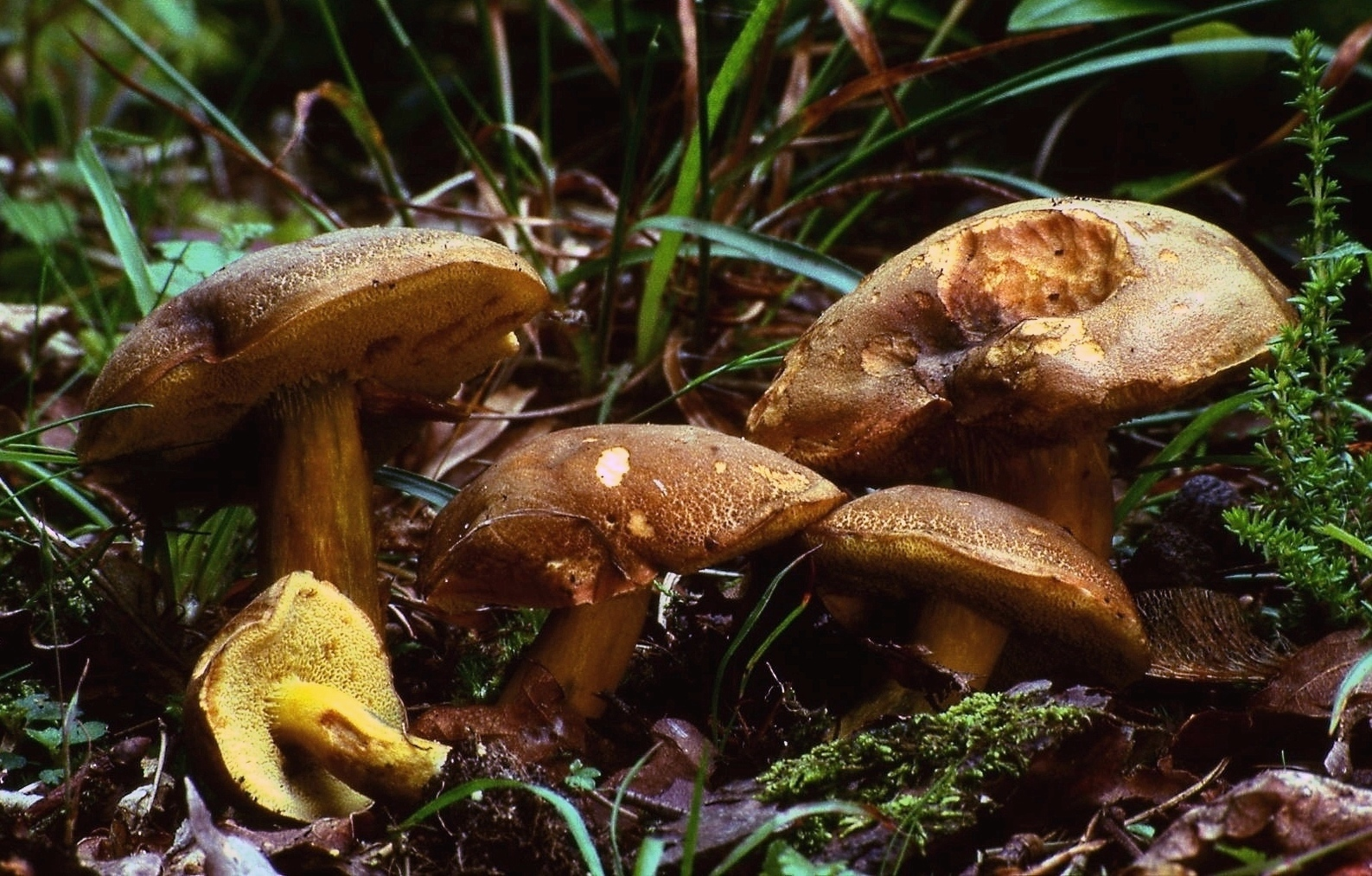

Scientific classification
- Kingdom: Fungi
- Division: Basidiomycota
- Class: Agaricomycetes
- Order: Boletales
- Family: Boletaceae
- Genus: Xerocomellus
- Species: X. porosporus

Binomial name
- Xerocomellus porosporus (Imler ex Watling) Šutara (2008)

Synonyms
- Boletus porosporus Imler ex Watling (1968); Xerocomus porosporus Imler

= Xerocomellus porosporus =

Species of fungus

Xerocomellus porosporus Mycological characteristics
- Pores on hymenium
- Cap is convex
- Stipe is bare
- Spore print is olive-brown
- Edibility is edible or edible, but unpalatable

Xerocomellus porosporus is a small wild mushroom in the family Boletaceae. These mushrooms have tubes and pores instead of gills beneath their caps. It is commonly known as the sepia bolete.

== Taxonomy ==
This bolete was described and given the scientific name Xerocomus porosporus in 1958 by Louis Imler (1900 - 1993), who was the founder of the Antwerp Mycological Circle. The currently accepted scientific name Xerocomellus porosporus dates from a 2008 publication by Czech mycologist Josef Å utara, whose studied in detail morphological character of this and other closely related boletes – since further supported by DNA studies.

== Description ==
When fully expanded, the caps are up to 8 centimetres (3.1 in) in diameter, and are soon cracked or fissured. Varying in colour from putty beige to dull brown, or olivaceous. The stem is usually olivaceous with a red zone in the upper part or with imperceptible reddish spots in the lower part; more yellow at the apex, and bruises brown. It darkens to dark brick or vinaceous towards the base. The tubes are 13 to 20 centimetres (5.1 to 7.9 in) long, initially lemon yellow, later olivaceous, and they bruise bluish. The pores are narrow, 0.2–0.5 mm in diameter, angular, lemon yellow, and darken later. They also bruise blue. The flesh is pale lemon yellow or buff in the cap, and chrome yellow in the stem apex. Hyphae without clamp connections. No amyloid or dextrinoid reactions were observed in any part of the fruit body.

The spores give an olive-brown spore print. At microscopic level this bolete has truncate (chopped off) spores; the spore dimensions are 13–15 by 4–5 μm.

== Distribution and habitat ==
Xerocomellus porosporus appears occasionally in the autumn, and grows singly or in small groups in mixed deciduous woods, particularly with oak, hornbeams, and beech. This species is widespread in northern temperate zones, but somewhat rare in Europe.

== Edibility ==
Xerocomellus porosporus is edible but of little culinary value, being bland, and mushy when cooked.

== See also ==
- List of Boletus species
