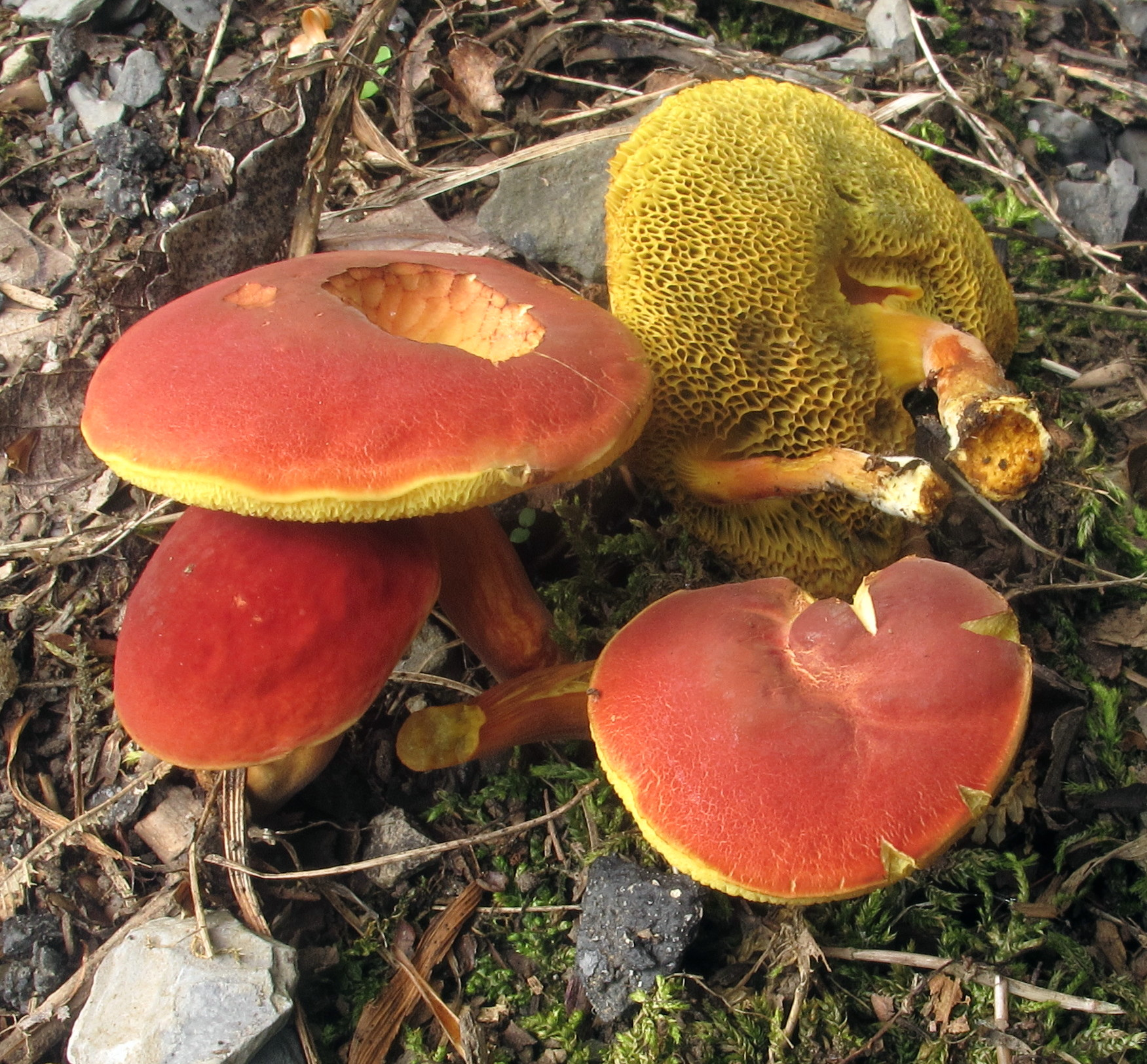
- Hortiboletus rubellus

Scientific classification
- Kingdom: Fungi
- Division: Basidiomycota
- Class: Agaricomycetes
- Order: Boletales
- Family: Boletaceae
- Genus: Hortiboletus; Simonini, Vizzini & Gelard (2015)

Type species
- Hortiboletus rubellus (Krombh.) Simonini, Vizzini & Gelardi (2015)

Species
- See tText

= Hortiboletus =

Genus of fungi

Hortiboletus is a genus of fungi in the family Boletaceae. It was circumscribed in 2015 by Giampaolo Simonini, Alfredo Vizzini, and Matteo Gelardi. The erection of Hortiboletus follows recent molecular studies that outlined a new phylogenetic framework for the Boletaceae. Hortiboletus is derived from the Latin word hortus "garden", referring to a typical habitat of the type species, Hortiboletus rubellus. The bolete H. bubalinus, originally described as a Boletus and later placed in Xerocomus, was transferred to the genus by Bálint Dima. In 2015, Alona Yu. Biketova transferred Boletus campestris and Boletus engelii to Hortiboletus.

Hortiboletus can be separated from closely related genera by their smooth basidiospores which are not striate or truncate and with an average spore quotient (length divided by width) usually lower than or up to 2.6.

== Species ==
Image	Name	Year	Distribution
	Hortiboletus amygdalinus Xue T. Zhu & Zhu L. Yang	2016	China
	Hortiboletus arduinus N.K.Zeng, H.J.Xie & W.F.Lin	2020	China
	Hortiboletus bubalinus(Oolbekk. & Duin) L. Albert & Dima	2015 (1991)	Europe, North America, New Zealand
	Hortiboletus campestris (A.H. Sm. & Thiers) Biketova & Wasser	2015 (1971)	United States
	Hortiboletus coccyginus (Thiers) C.F. Schwarz, N. Siegel & J.L. Frank	2020 (1975)	California and Oregon, United States
	Hortiboletus engelii (Hlaváček) Biketova & Wasser	2015 (2001)	Europe, Pakistan, United States
	Hortiboletus indorubellus K. Das, D. Chakr., Baghela, S.K. Singh & Dentinger	2016	India
	Hortiboletus kohistanensis A. Naseer, S. Sarwar & A.N. Khalid	2019	Pakistan
	Hortiboletus napaeus N.K.Zeng, H.J.Xie, S.Jiang & Zhi Q.Liang	2020	China
	Hortiboletus rubellus (Krombh.) Simonini, Vizzini & Gelardi	2015 (1936)	Europe
	Hortiboletus rupicapreus Svetash., A.V.Alexandrova, O.V.Morozova & T.H.G.Pham	2021	Vietnam
	Hortiboletus subpaludosus (W.F. Chiu) Xue T. Zhu & Zhu L. Yang	2016 (1948)	China

List of species from the Index Fungorum.

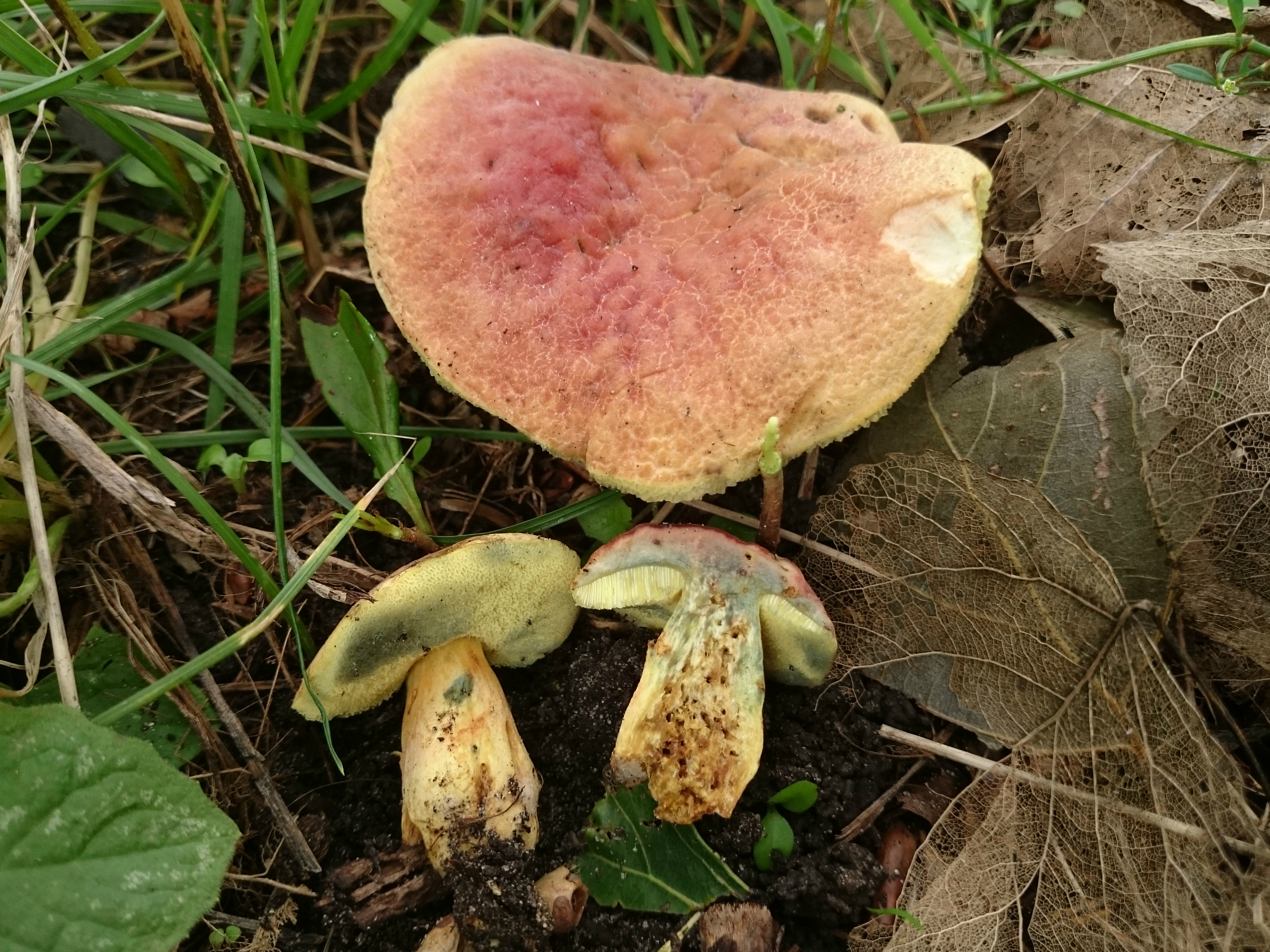
Hortiboletus bubalinus

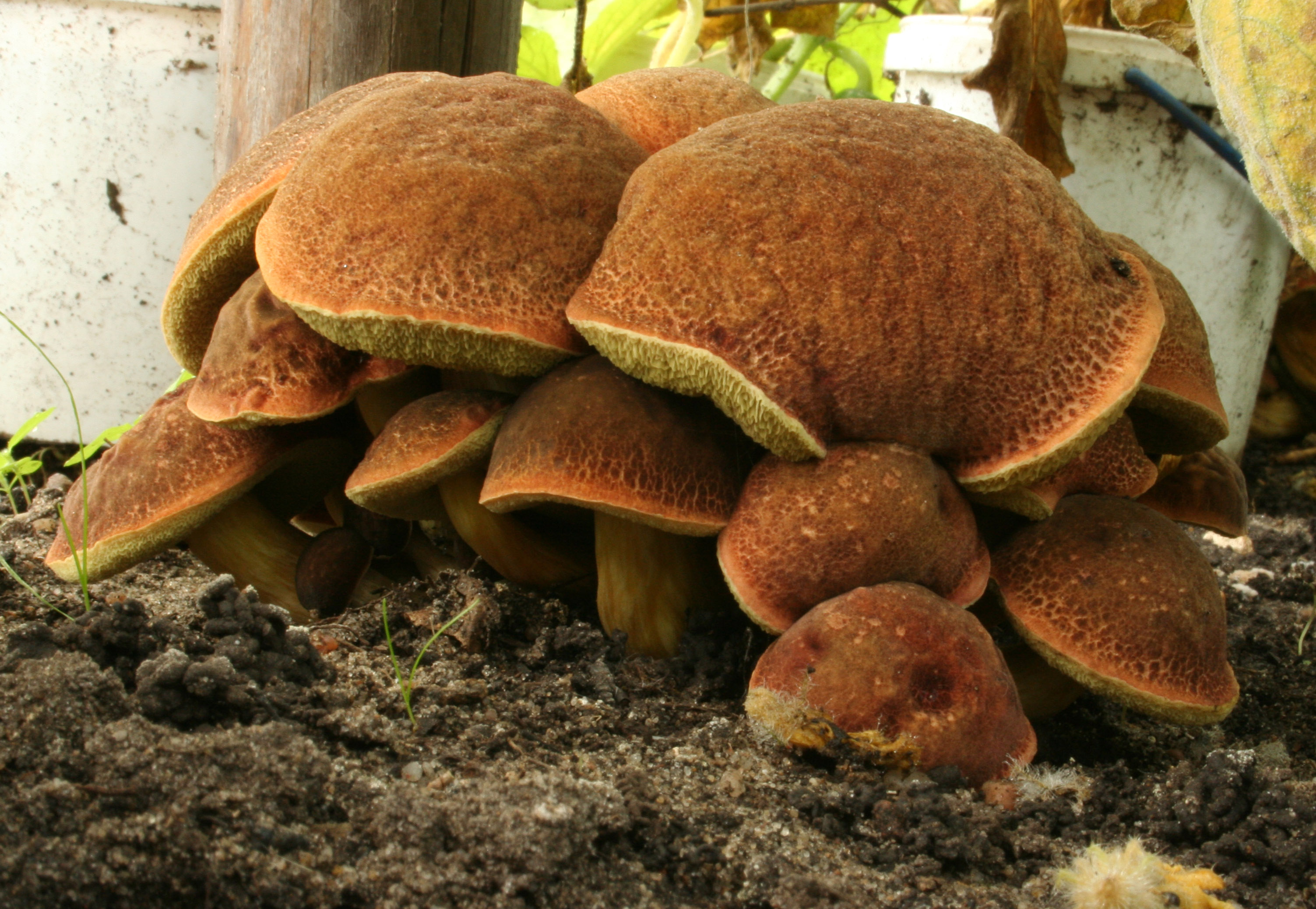
Hortiboletus engelii

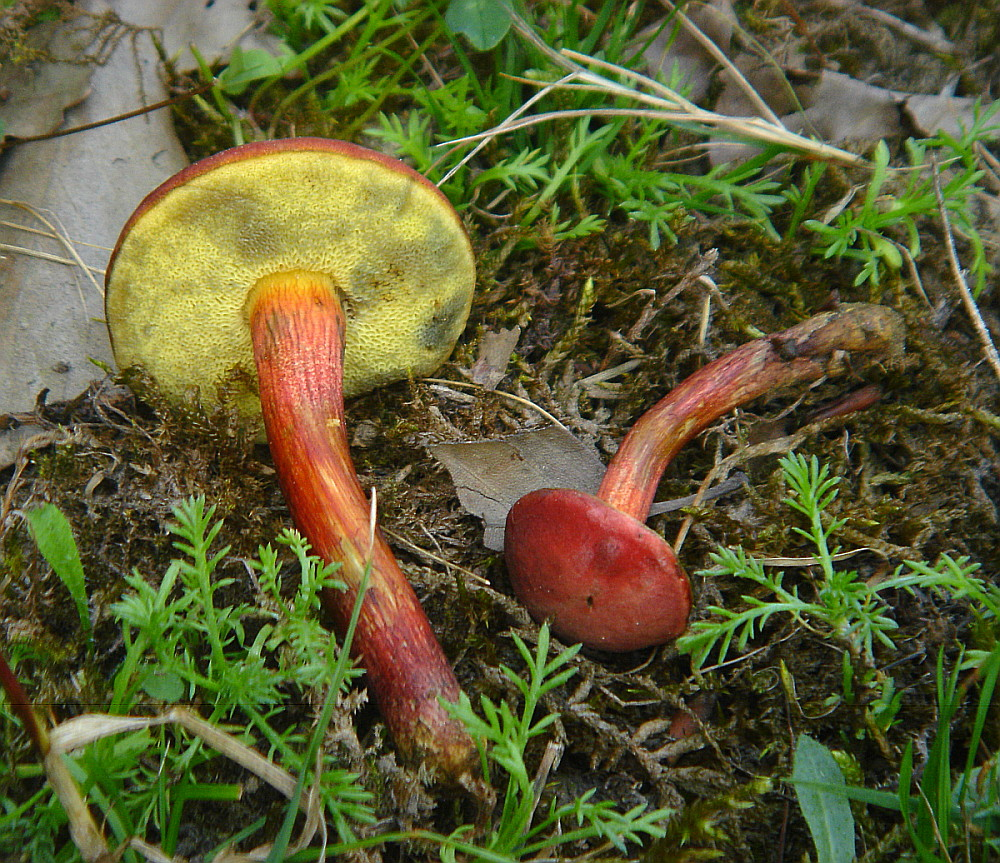
Hortiboletus rubellus
