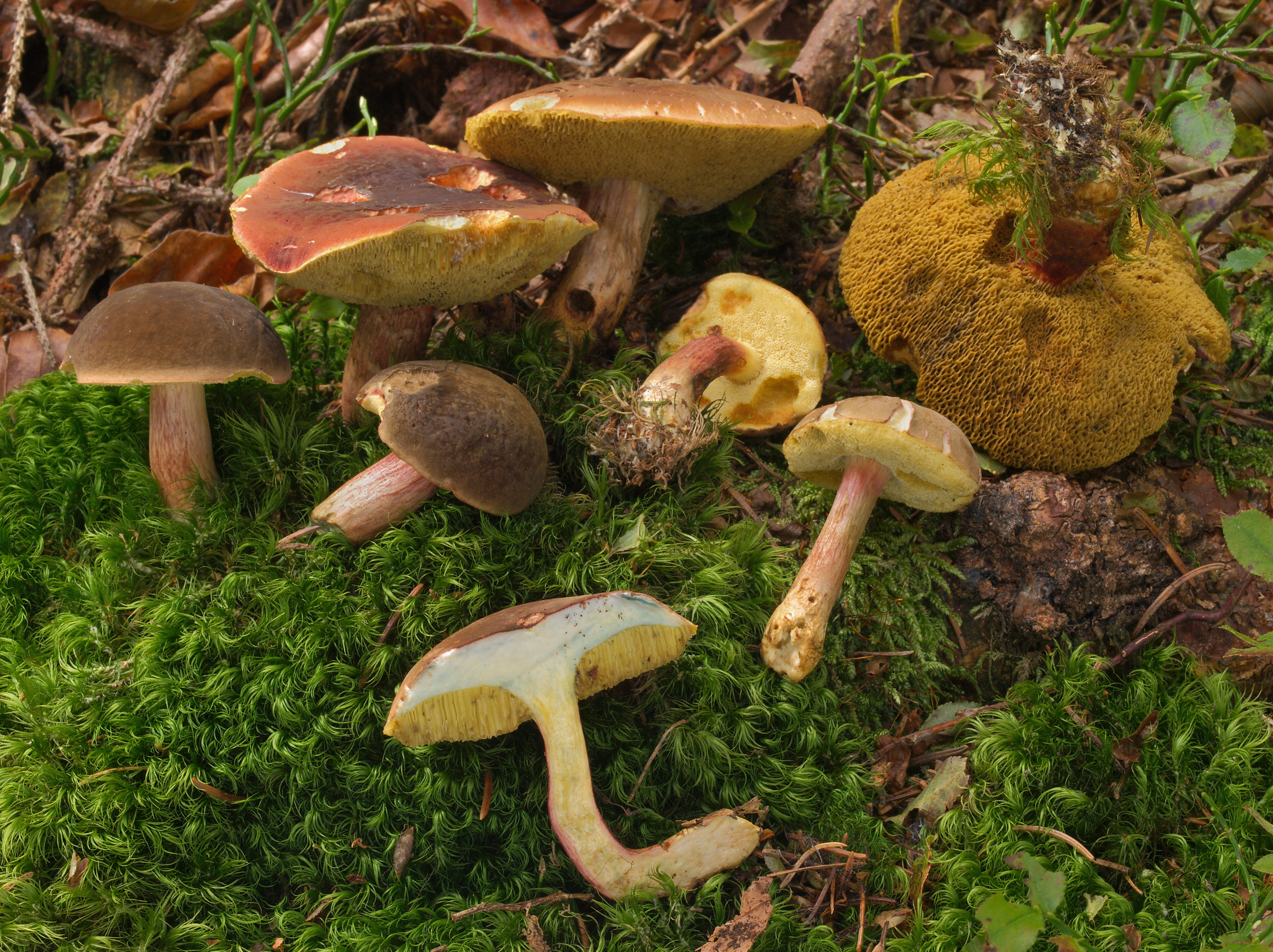

Scientific classification
- Domain: Eukaryota
- Kingdom: Fungi
- Division: Basidiomycota
- Class: Agaricomycetes
- Order: Boletales
- Family: Boletaceae
- Genus: Xerocomellus
- Species: X. pruinatus

Binomial name
- Xerocomellus pruinatus (Fr. & Hök) Šutara (2008)

= Xerocomellus pruinatus =

Species of fungus

Xerocomellus pruinatus, commonly known as the matte bolete and formerly known as Boletus pruinatus or Xerocomus pruinatus, is a mushroom in the family Boletaceae native to Europe.

It was transferred to the new genus Xerocomellus described by Czech mycologist Josef Šutara in 2008.
