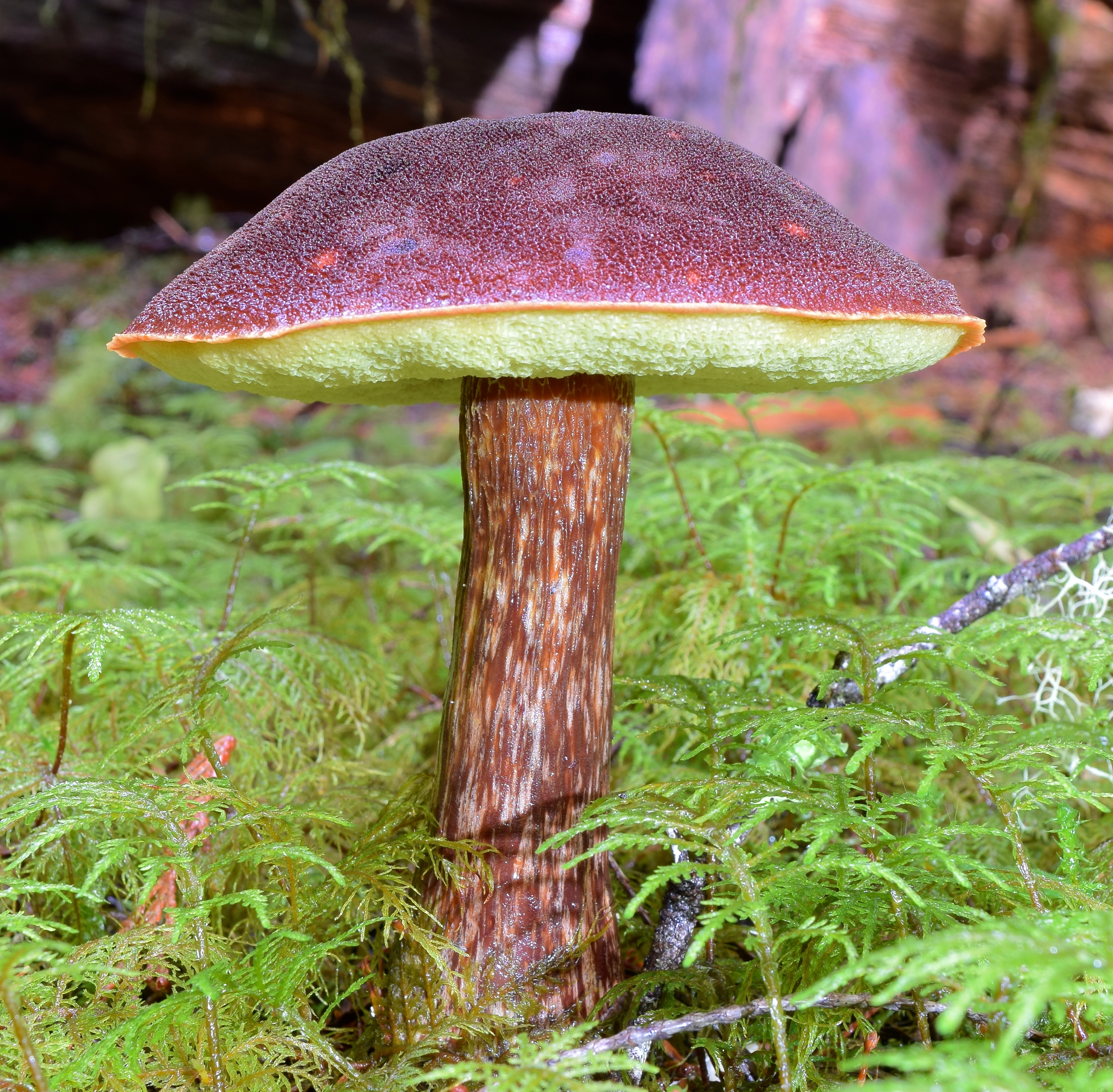
- From H.J. Andrews Forest, Oregon

Scientific classification
- Kingdom: Fungi
- Division: Basidiomycota
- Class: Agaricomycetes
- Order: Boletales
- Family: Boletaceae
- Genus: Aureoboletus
- Species: A. mirabilis

Binomial name
- Aureoboletus mirabilis (Murrill) Halling (2015)

Synonyms
- Ceriomyces mirabilis Murrill (1912); Boletus mirabilis (Murrill) Murrill (1912); Xerocomus mirabilis (Murrill) Singer (1940); Boletellus mirabilis (Murrill) Singer (1945); Heimioporus mirabilis (Murrill) E. Horak (2004)

= Aureoboletus mirabilis =

Species of fungus

Aureoboletus mirabilis
- Mycological characteristics
- Pores on hymenium
- Cap is convex
- Hymenium is adnate
- Stipe is bare
- Spore print is olive-brown
- Ecology is mycorrhizal
- Edibility is choice

Aureoboletus mirabilis, commonly known as the admirable bolete, the bragger's bolete, and the velvet top, is a species of fungus in the Boletaceae mushroom family. The fruit body has a dark reddish-brown cap, yellow to greenish-yellow pores on the undersurface of the cap, and a reddish-brown stem with long narrow reticulations.

Aureoboletus mirabilis is found in coniferous forests along the Pacific Coast of North America, and in Asia. Unusual for boletes, A. mirabilis sometimes appears to fruit on the wood or woody debris of Hemlock trees, suggesting a saprobic lifestyle. Despite the occasional appearances to the contrary, A. mirabilis is mycorrhizal, and forms a close association with the tree's roots. The mushroom is edible.

== Taxonomy ==
Aureoboletus mirabilis was first described by American mycologist William Alphonso Murrill in 1912 as Ceriomyces mirabilis, based on specimens found in Seattle, Washington. In a subsequent publication that same year, he switched the genus to Boletus. In 1940, fungal taxonomist Rolf Singer transferred the taxon to the genus Xerocomus; five years later he switched it to Boletellus. However, many mycologists did not recognize the distinction between Boletus and Boletellus before molecular phylogenetics studies found them to be distinct genera. In 1966, American mycologist Harry Delbert Thiers wrote about the issue in his survey of California boletes:

The proper disposition of this species in the present taxonomic scheme of the boletes is somewhat debatable. ... The distinction between Boletus and Boletellus is not so clear-cut. The spores are typically smooth which, in conjunction with the divergent tube trama, dry to moist pileus and yellow tubes, seem to place it very convincingly in Boletus. However, the present disposition in Boletellus seems most satisfactory to me. The sporocarps have the stature and general appearance of other members of that genus such as Boletellus russellii and B. ananas (Curt.) Murr. These similarities include the disproportionately long stipe which is frequently shaggy-reticulate and constricted at the apex, and a comparatively small pileus.

Nine years later, after further consideration, Thiers changed his mind:

In an earlier paper this species was considered to belong to the genus Boletellus because of its stature, general appearance, and because some workers had reported the spores as being obscurely punctate or roughened. Repeated examinations of California material have failed to reveal any roughened spores and since, in modern concepts Boletellus is restricted to species having such spores, it has been placed back in Boletus.

The species has also been placed in genus Heimioporus, newly described in 2004 by Swiss mycologist Egon Horak. In 2015 it was transferred to the genus Aureoboletus based on DNA evidence.

In a 2001 analysis of ribosomal DNA sequences for a number of taxa in the Boletales order, A. mirabilis was found to be most closely related to species such as Boletus edulis, Phylloporus rhodoxanthus, and Tylopilus felleus. Within the Boletales clade (a group of related species roughly equivalent to the Boletales order), these species were all in the so-called "boletoid radiation", a group of taxa that are thought to have diverged evolutionarily from a single boletoid ancestor. However, more recent studies containing more taxa have found A. mirabilis to be most closely related to Aureoboletus species.

=== Etymology ===
The specific epithet mirabilis means "admirable" or "marvelous". Aureoboletus mirabilis is commonly known as the "admirable bolete", the "bragger's bolete", and the "velvet top".

== Description ==
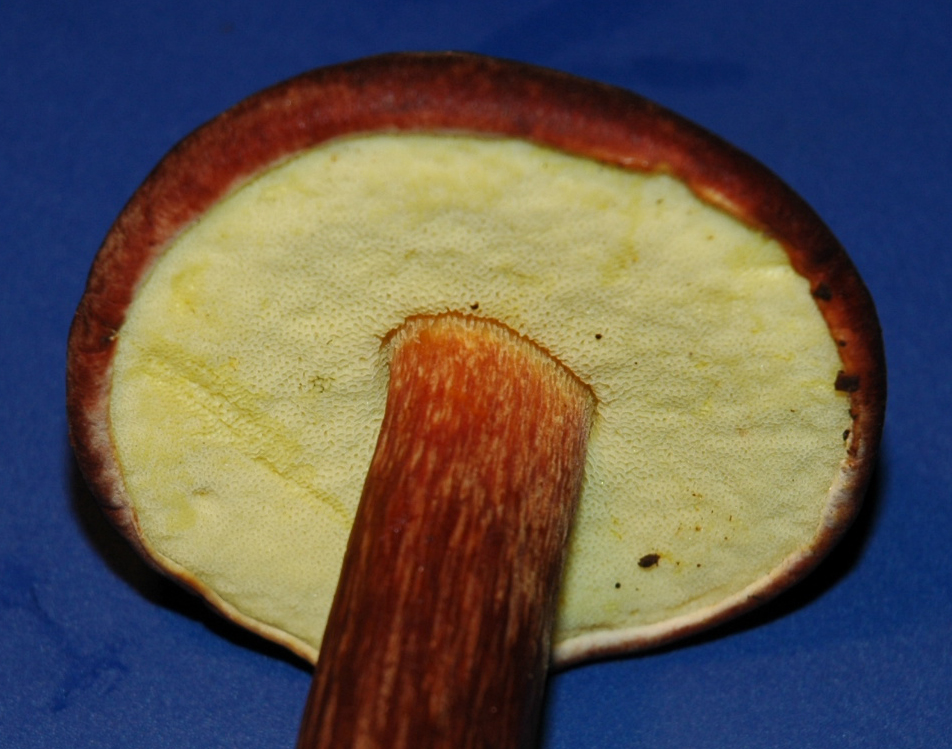
Spores are produced in minute tubes, which appear on the underside of the cap as pores.

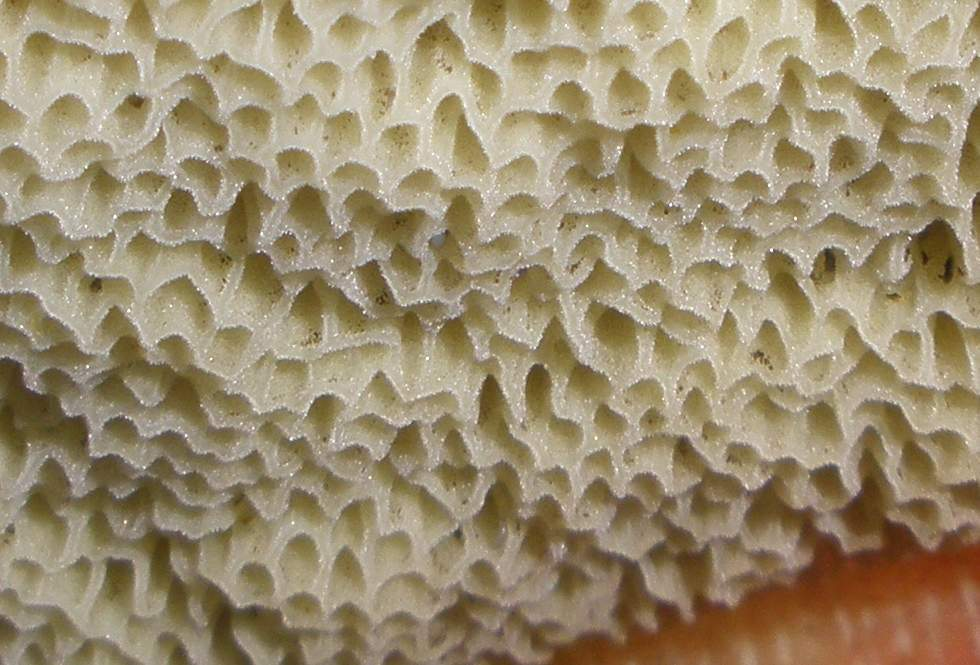
Closeup of pore surface

The caps of the fruit bodies are up to 15 cm (6 in) in diameter, red or brownish-red in color, initially convex but flattening out as they develop. The cap is fleshy, with a rough surface that is slippery or slimy in young specimens, or in moist environments. Older specimens generally have dry and velvety cap surfaces. The texture of the cap surface is rough, at first because of flattened-down (appressed) fibrils, and later with bent-back (recurved) scales or sometimes with cracked rough patches that resemble dried cracked mud. Young specimens may have a small flap of thin tissue attached to the margin or edge of the cap, remnants of a reduced partial veil. The surface is covered with tufts of soft woolly hairs, and has persistent papillae.

The tubes underneath the cap are up to 2.5 cm (1 in) long, and are initially pale yellowish before becoming greenish-yellow with age, or mustard-yellow if injured. The pores have diameters of 1–2 mm. The flesh can be pale pink, yellow, or white in color, sometimes with hints of blue, and is usually red just beneath the surface. The flesh is firm but watery, thick, and either not changing color or becoming deeper yellow with bruising. It is 1 to 1.5 cm (3/8 to 5/8 in) thick at the junction of the stem with the cap.

The stem is up to 18 cm (7 in) long, usually thickest at the base and tapering upward, up to 4 cm (1 5/8 in) thick below and 0.5 to 1 cm (1/4 to 3/8 in) at the apex. It typically starts out with a bulbous shape but becomes more equal in width throughout as it matures. The surface is dry, often roughened and pitted, and with a network of grooves or ridges (striations) or reticulations near the top of the stem. It is about the same color as the cap, but will bruise to a darker reddish-brown near the base. The stem is solid (that is, not hollow), and its flesh pale purplish at the top, but yellowish below. Mycelium at the base of the stem is also yellow.

=== Microscopic characteristics ===
Collected in deposit, the spores are olive-brown. Viewed with a microscope, the spores are spindle-shaped to roughly elliptical, with smooth, thick walls, and have dimensions of 18–22 by 7–9 μm. Overholts' 1940 publication on the species reported spore dimensions of 20–26 by 8–9 μm. The basidia (spore-bearing cells) are club-shaped, hyaline (translucent), 4-spored, and 31–36 by 7–11 μm. Cystidia (sterile cells on the face of a gill) are thin-walled, and measure 60–90 by 10–18 μm. There are no clamp connections present in the hyphae.

=== Chemical reactions ===
Chemical tests are sometimes used to rapidly distinguish between closely related or morphologically similar species of mushrooms, or, in some cases, as characters to group species into subsections of a genus. Pigments present in the fungal hyphae are dissolved or react differently with various chemicals, and the color reactions may be used as taxonomic characters. When a drop of 10% aqueous solution of ammonium hydroxide is applied to the cap of B. mirabilis, the tissue turns a fleeting pink color that fades away. If a drop of commercial bleach (calcium hypochlorite) is applied, the tissue loses its color and becomes a pale blue.

=== Similar species ===
Aureoboletus mirabilis differs from other boletes in the covering of the cap, which superficially resembles that found on the surface of the tan-to-pinkish-brown Boletellus ananas and the dark brown or black Strobilomyces strobilaceus, but the scales are more rigid with a somewhat conical shape. It can be distinguished from these two species by both its bay-brown color and the absence of a veil, which the other two possess. Boletus edulis is separated from A. mirabilis by the color and texture of the cap, tubes and stem. Boletus coniferarum turns blue when bruised and has a very bitter taste. Aureoboletus projectellus is also similar in appearance, but is found in eastern North America, as is Boletellus chrysenteroides. Xerocomellus atropurpureus is usually smaller.

== Habitat and distribution ==
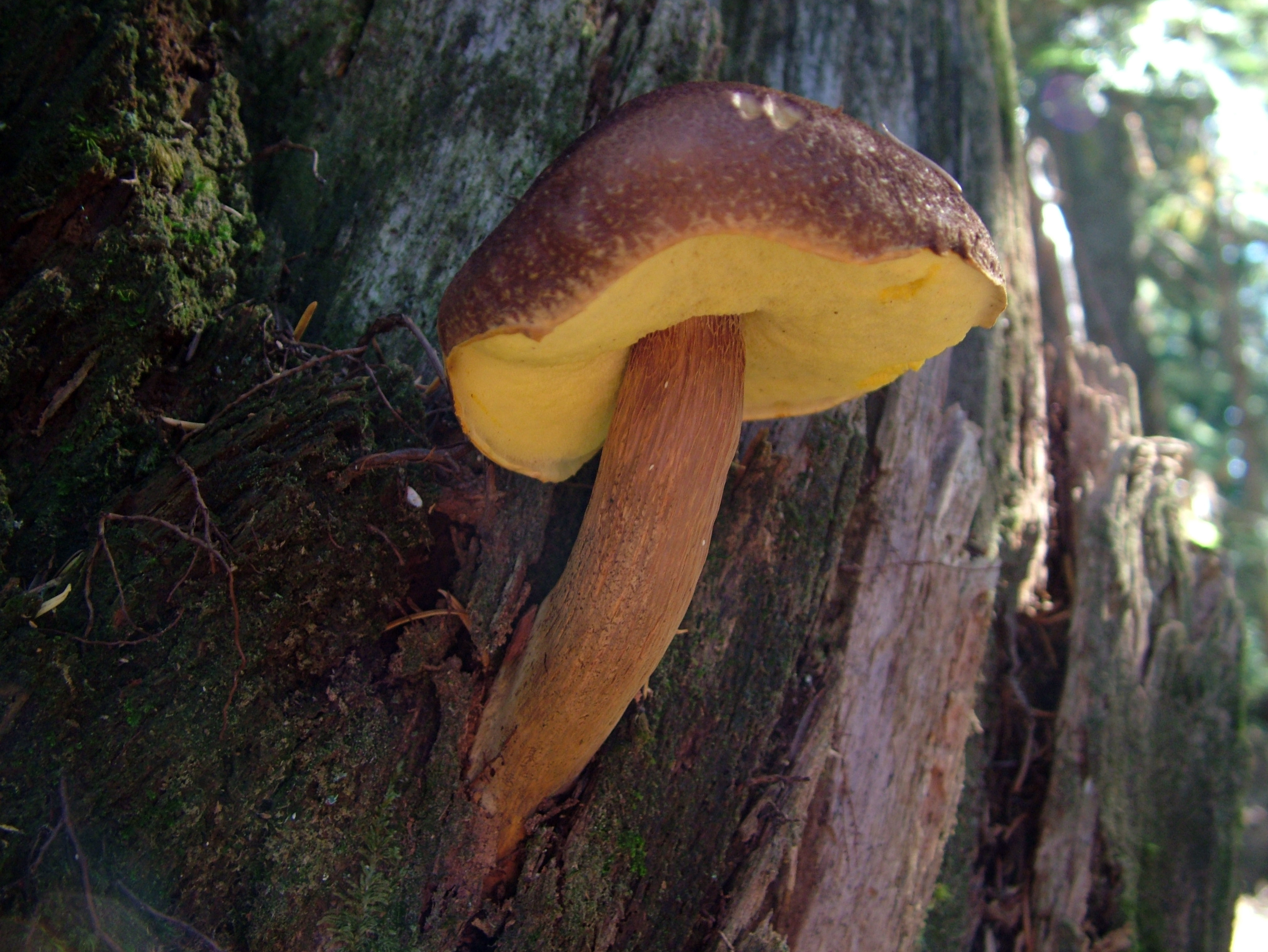
Growing out of a decaying hemlock stump, Mount Baker-Snoqualmie National Forest, Washington state

The fruit bodies grow solitarily, scattered, or sometimes in small groups on the ground or on well-decayed conifer logs, especially of western and mountain hemlock, but occasionally also Douglas-fir and western red cedar. The fungus is strongly suspected to form mycorrhizal associations with hemlock, although standard attempts at growing B. mirabilis mycorrhizae in laboratory culture have failed. Although fruit bodies are sometimes found growing on logs with advanced brown cubical rot—a trait suggestive of cellulose-decomposing saprobic fungi—the rotten wood harboring the fungi typically contains abundant conifer roots. It has been suggested that B. mirabilis has specifically adapted to this niche to reduce competition for nutrients with other mycorrhizal fungi, and further, that the inability to culture mycorrhizae in the lab using standard techniques may be because certain physical or chemical characteristics of the wood with brown cubical rot are required for fungal growth.

Aureoboletus mirabilis, which usually appears from late summer to autumn, is distributed in the hemlock forests of the Pacific Coast Ranges from Northern California to Alaska, the Cascade Range, as well as in interior forests such as in Manitoba. It has a disjunct distribution, as it has been also been collected in Japan and Taiwan.

== Uses ==
Aureoboletus mirabilis is edible, yet tasteless according to Murrill, who also noted that "this is one of the most difficult species to preserve, owing to its extremely juicy consistency". In contrast, modern field guides suggest this species to be an excellent edible. One book opines that only Boletus edulis surpasses its flavour. When sauteed in butter, the flesh has been noted to have a lemony taste.

Field specimens covered with the white mold Sepedonium ampullosporum should not be consumed. The mushroom may also be attacked by Hypomyces chrysospermus.

== See also ==
- List of North American boletes
