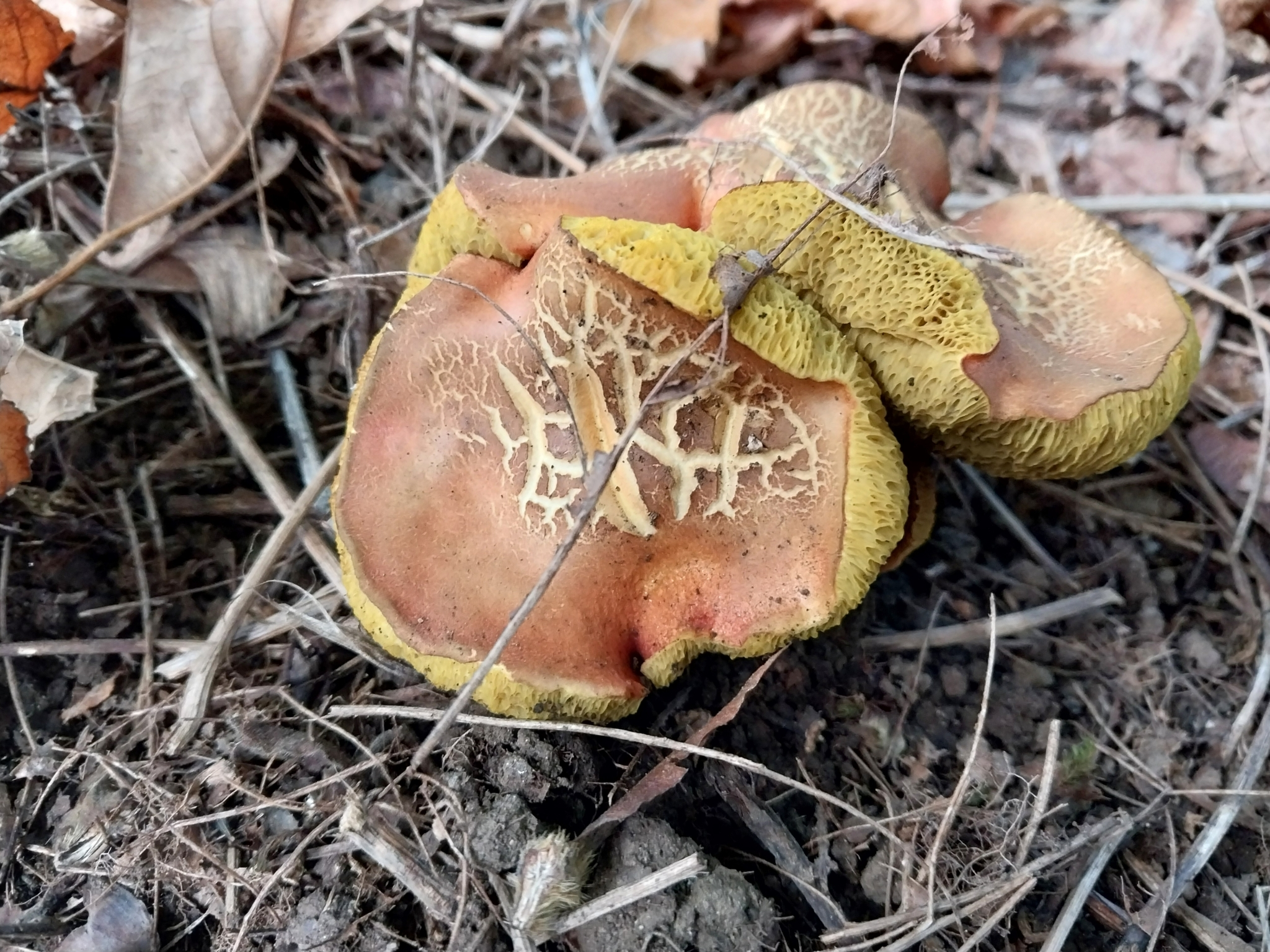

Conservation status
- Least Concern (IUCN 3.1)

Scientific classification
- Kingdom: Fungi
- Division: Basidiomycota
- Class: Agaricomycetes
- Order: Boletales
- Family: Boletaceae
- Genus: Hortiboletus
- Species: H. coccyginus

Binomial name
- Hortiboletus coccyginus (Theirs) C.F. Schwarz, N. Siegel & J.L. Frank

Synonyms
- Boletus coccyginus Thiers

= Hortiboletus coccyginus =

Species of fungus

Hortiboletus coccyginus
- Mycological characteristics
- Pores on hymenium
- Cap is convex
- Hymenium is adnexed
- Stipe is bare
- Spore print is olive-brown
- Ecology is mycorrhizal
- Edibility is unknown

Hortiboletus coccyginus, commonly known as the sumac-colored bolete, is a species of mushroom in the genus Hortiboletus. It is rare.

== Taxonomy ==
Hortiboletus coccyginus was first described in California in 1975. Back then, it was known as Boletus coccyginus. In 2020, JL Frank transferred it to the genus Hortiboletus.

== Description ==
Hortiboletus coccyginus has a rosy-colored cap that is about 2–6 cm (0.79–2.36 in) wide. Sometimes, the it cracks in older specimens. The stipe is about 1.5–7 cm (0.59–2.76 in) tall and about 0.5–2 cm (0.20–0.79 in) wide. The pores are yellow. While on younger mushrooms they do not bruise blue, older specimens occasionally stain bluish green.

== Habitat and ecology ==
Hortiboletus coccyginus grows under several different types of trees, including coast live oak, tanoak, and douglas-fir. It is known to grow in mixed forests, and it is known from California and Oregon. Despite being rare, it is listed by the IUCN Red List as Least Concern.

== See also ==
- List of North American boletes
