= Sanford Myron Zeller =

American mycologist

- Born: October 19, 1885; Coldwater, Michigan
- Died: November 4, 1948 (aged 63)
- Scientific career
- Fields: Mycology, plant pathology

Sanford Myron Zeller (19 October 1885 – 4 November 1948) was an American mycologist.

Born in Coldwater, Michigan, Zeller was educated at Lawrence College in Wisconsin, then Greenville College in Illinois, from which he received a Bachelor of Science degree in 1909. He earned his doctorate in botany in 1917 at Washington University in St. Louis, and two years later started a 29-year stint as a plant pathologist and professor at the Oregon Agricultural Experiment Station in Corvallis, Oregon. He published over 150 scientific papers during his career. Zeller specialized in the gasteroid fungi.

Independently, he described 3 orders, 9 families, 7 genera, 81 species, and published 29 new names and combinations, as well as 3 genera, 62 species, and 59 combinations in collaborations with other scientists. Zeller was the associate editor of the scientific journal Phytopathology from 1924 to 1930.

== Eponymous taxa ==
- Aleurodiscus zelleri Burt 1926
- Armillaria zelleri D.E. Stuntz & A.H.Sm. 1949
- Boletellus zelleri (Murrill) Singer, Snell & E.A.Dick 1960
- Boletus zelleri (Murrill) Murrill 1912
- Ceriomyces zelleri Murrill 1912
- Craterellus zelleri Burt 1926
- Elasmomyces zellerianus Singer & A.H.Sm. 1960
- Exidia zelleri Lloyd 1920
- Godronia zelleri Seaver 1945
- Macowanites zellerianus (Singer & A.H.Sm.) Trappe, T.Lebel & Castellano 2002
- Polyporus zelleri Murrill 1915
- Rhizopogon zelleri A.H.Sm. 1966
- Russula zelleri Burl. 1936
- Tricholoma zelleri (D.E.Stuntz & A.H.Sm.) Ovrebo & Tylutki 1975
- Xerocomus zelleri (Murrill) Snell 1944
- Zelleromyces Singer & A.H.Sm. 1960

== See also ==
- Category:Taxa named by Sanford Myron Zeller
