= Anna Frances Walker =

Australian botanist (1830–1913)

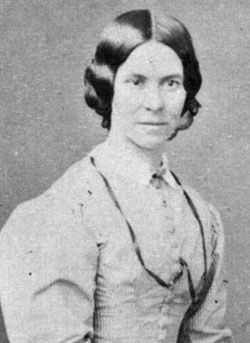
- Born: Anna Frances Walker; 23 June 1830; Concord, Colony of New South Wales
- Died: 5 January 1913 (aged 82); Concord, New South Wales, Australia
- Occupations: writer, botanical collector, botanical illustrator

Anna Frances Walker (1830–1913) was an early Australian botanical collector and plant illustrator.

== Life ==
She was born in 1830 at the family home "Rhodes" in Concord, New South Wales on the Parramatta River, one of a large family. In 1832, the family moved to Van Diemen's Land, where she, like her mother, collected and painted botanical subjects. At the age of 16 or 17, she returned to New South Wales to live with her grandmother, and there she was instructed in watercolour painting by Henry Curzon Allport. After the death of her father (1861), the family returned to the Sydney property, "Rhodes" (1870), where Annie remained for the rest of her life.

By August 1881, Anna had amassed a considerable body of work, and she contacted Ferdinand von Mueller in Melbourne, for help with identifications and advice about publishing. Eventually, in 1887, she self-published (Flowers of New South Wales( (a small collection of her paintings), but the poor quality of the lithographs let her down (as did her text, which betrayed little botanical understanding). Plants illustrated were: Ceratopetalum gummiferum, Acacia spectabilis, Epacris longiflora, Zieria laevigata, Blandfordia nobilis, Darwinia fascicularis, Ricinocarpos pinifolius, Epacris microphylla, Sprengelia incarnata, Gompholobium grandiflorum, Bauera rubioides, Melaleuca linariifolia, Eriostemon silicifolius, Kennedia monophylla, Clematis glycinoides.

Ultimately, her collection consisted of some 1700 illustrations of plants from both Tasmania and New South Wales, painted between 1875 and 1910, but she failed to find a publisher, and sold her collection (eight volumes) to David Scott Mitchell for £70 in 1910.

The National Herbarium of Victoria (MEL) holds 19 specimens collected by her in New South Wales, and sent to Mueller between the years of 1892 and 1895. (Twenty-one letters from Mueller to Anna survive.)

The Australasian Virtual Herbarium lists seventeen specimens collected by "Walker, A.F.", all housed at MEL, of which fourteen are fungi and three are plants. Cortinarius walkeri, a fungus, is named for her, and the type specimen is MEL 0220681A, a specimen she collected.

== Botanical drawings ==
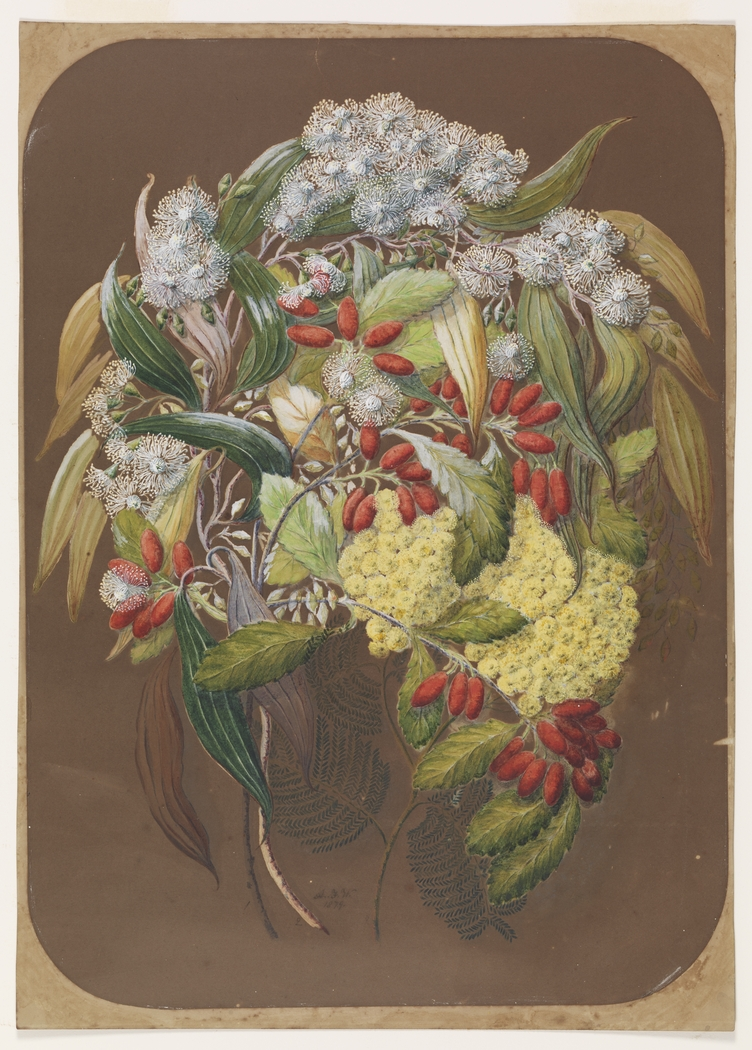

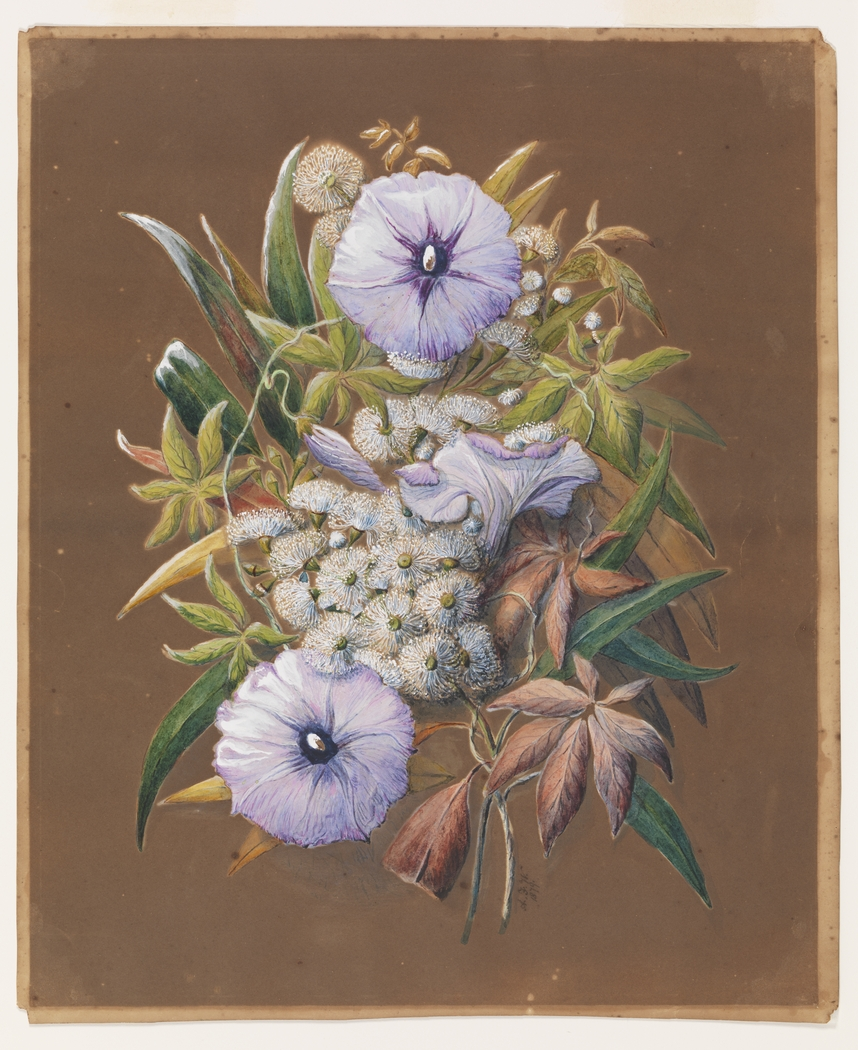

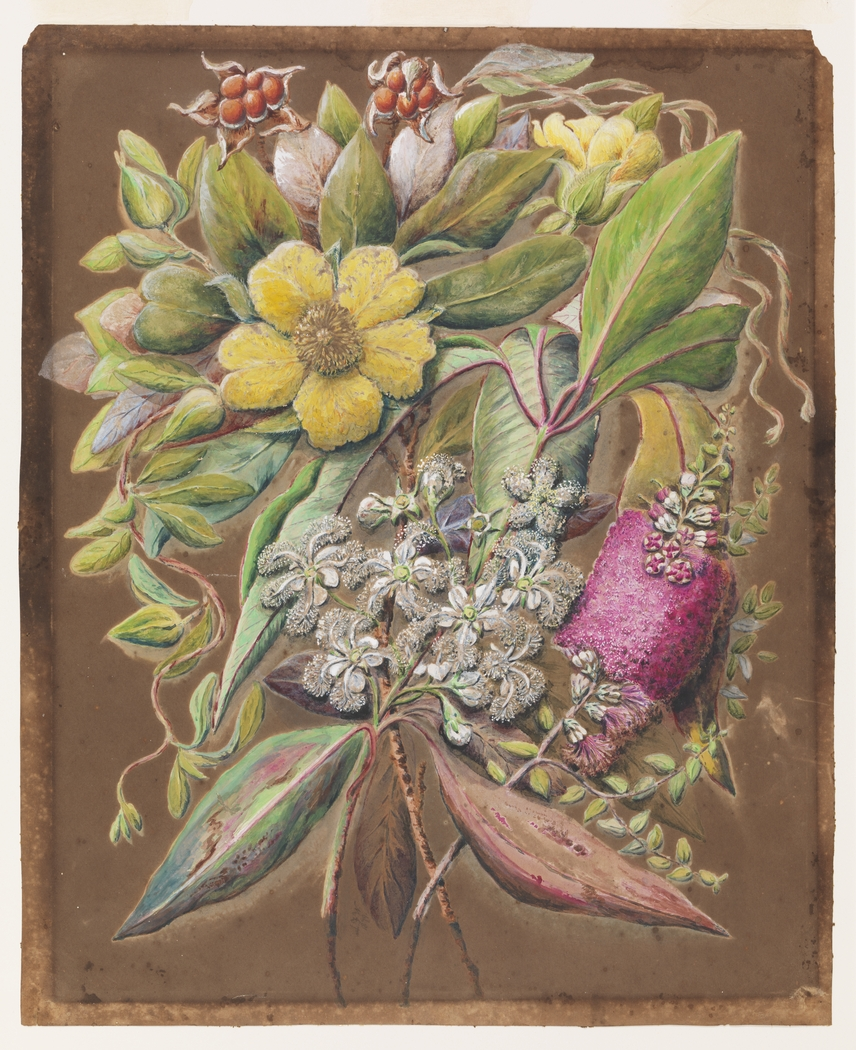

AVH specimens collected by "Walker, A.F."

year	scientific Name		Catalog Number
1892	Piptoporus australiensis	Fungi	MEL 2015821A
1893	Boletellus emodensis	Fungi	MEL 1053808A
1893	Clavaria fusiporius	Fungi	MEL 2069141A
1893	Clavaria spinulosa	Fungi	MEL 2070183A
1893	Cortinarius walkeri (Type specimen)	Fungi	MEL 0220681A
1893	Elaeocarpus reticulatus	Plantae	MEL 2227350A
1893	Gymnopilus allantopus	Fungi	MEL 1052353A
1893	Hemigenia purpurea	Plantae	MEL 0646630A
1893	Lactarius eucalypti	Fungi	MEL 1052538A
1893	Omphalotus nidiformis	Fungi	MEL 1053918A
1893	Pleurotus australis	Fungi	MEL 1052555A
1893	Ramaria botrytis	Fungi	MEL 1053748A
1893	Ramaria botrytis	Fungi	MEL 1053749A
1893	Russula clelandii	Fungi	MEL 1052583A
1893	Russula wollumbina	Fungi	MEL 1052585A
1893	Russula wollumbina	Fungi	MEL 1052584A
1895	Pomaderris ligustrina subsp. ligustrina	Plantae	MEL 0055293A

== Awards ==
In 1873, she was awarded a gold medal for watercolours of Tasmanian flowers at the London International Exhibition; in the Academy of Arts show of 1876, a certificate of merit; in the International Exhibition of 1879 (in Sydney), a "Highly Commended"; and at the Melbourne Exhibition of 1880, a first place.
