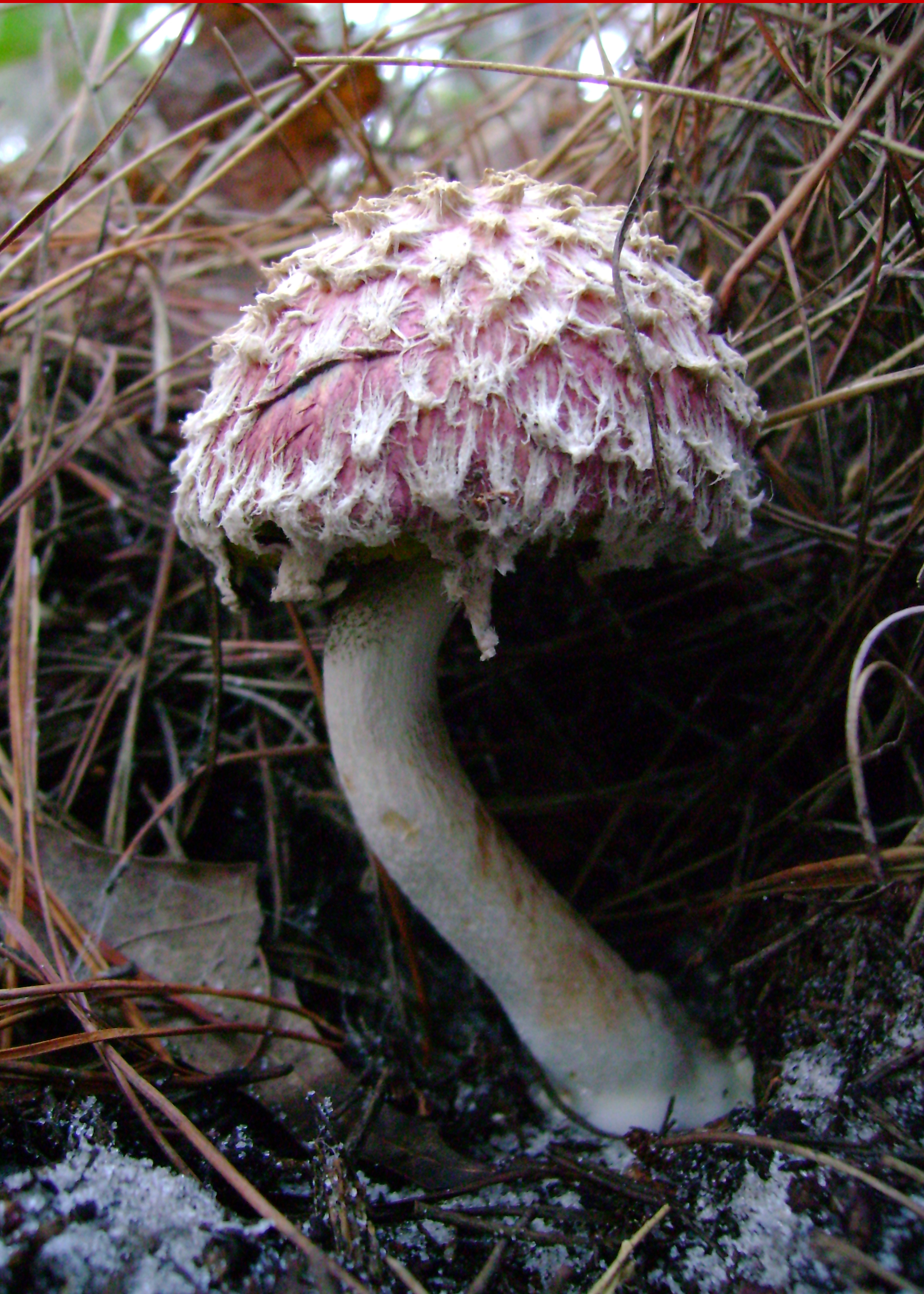

Scientific classification
- Kingdom: Fungi
- Division: Basidiomycota
- Class: Agaricomycetes
- Order: Boletales
- Family: Boletaceae
- Genus: Boletellus
- Species: B. ananas

Binomial name
- Boletellus ananas (M.A.Curtis) Murrill (1909)

Varieties
- B. ananas var. crassotunicatus Singer; B. ananas var. minor Singer

Synonyms
- Boletellus ananas var. crassotunicatus Singer; Boletellus ananas var. minor Singer; Boletellus coccineus var. crassotunicatus (Singer) Singer; Boletellus coccineus var. minor (Singer) Singer, J. García & L.D. Gómez; Boletus isabellinus Peck; Boletellus minor (Singer) L.D. Gómez; Boletus ananas M.A. Curtis; Boletus caribaeus var. crassotunicatus (Singer) Singer

= Boletellus ananas =

Species of fungus

Boletellus ananas Mycological characteristics
- Pores on hymenium
- Cap is convex
- Hymenium is adnate
- Stipe is bare
- Spore print is brown
- Ecology is mycorrhizal
- Edibility is edible but not recommended

Boletellus ananas, commonly known as the pineapple bolete, is a mushroom in the family Boletaceae, and the type species of the genus Boletellus. Previously known as Boletus ananas and Boletus coccinea (among other synonyms), the species was given its current name by William Alphonso Murrill in 1909.

The fruit body is characterized by the reddish-pink (or pinkish-tan to yellowish if an older specimen) scales on the cap that are often found hanging from the edge. The pore surface on the underside of the cap is made of irregular or angular pores up to 2 mm wide that bruise a blue color. It is yellow when young but ages to a deep olive-brown color. Microscopically, B. ananas is distinguished by large spores with cross striae on the ridges and spirally encrusted hyphae in the marginal appendiculae and flesh of the stem. Two varieties of B. ananas have been described.

It is distributed in southeastern North America, northeastern South America, Asia, and New Zealand, where it grows scattered or in groups on the ground, often at the base of oak and pine trees. Like many other boletes, this species is considered edible, but it is not recommended for consumption.

== Taxonomy ==
The species was first named by Moses Ashley Curtis as Boletus ananas in 1848, based on specimens he found near the Santee River, in South Carolina. In 1909, William Murrill described the new genus Boletellus and made Boletellus ananas the type species. According to Murrill, the taxon Boletus isabellinus, described by Charles Horton Peck in 1897 from specimens collected in Ocean Springs, Mississippi, is a synonym of B. ananas; Peck described this species from undeveloped specimens. Wally Snell later doubted Murrill's conclusion in a 1933 publication; he considered the differences in the spore structure too great to consider the species conspecific with B. ananas, although he admitted it was impossible to come to any definitive conclusions until mature fruit bodies and spore prints were available for study. Rolf Singer and colleagues (1992) suggested the name Boletellus coccineus for Boletellus ananas. Singer created this name, however, in the mistaken belief that the earliest available name for the taxon was Boletus coccineus, proposed by Elias Magnus Fries in 1838. However, Fries's name is an illegitimate later homonym (compare with Boletus coccineus, named by Bulliard in 1791), and Singer's combination is actually based on Strobilomyces coccineus, named by Pier Andrea Saccardo in 1888. The earliest available name for the species is therefore Boletus ananas M.A. Curtis 1848, the basionym of Boletellus ananas.

Boletellus ananas, as the type species of the genus Boletellus, is in section Boletellus that Singer based on the scaly, dry cap with red-pink tones, a marginal veil that clasps the stem when immature, and longitudinally ridged spores that are greater than 16 μm long. The genus name Boletellus means "small boletus", while the specific epithet ananas alludes to the name for pineapple, referring to the pineapple-like pattern of scales on the cap surface. The mushroom is commonly known as the "pineapple bolete".

== Description ==
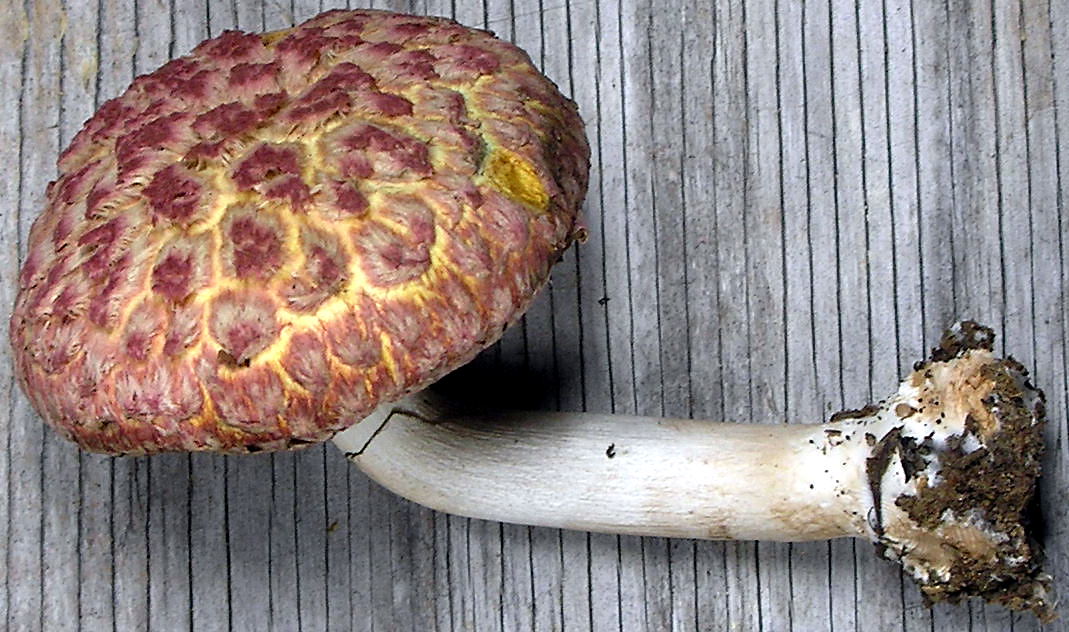
The cap surface is covered with squamules.

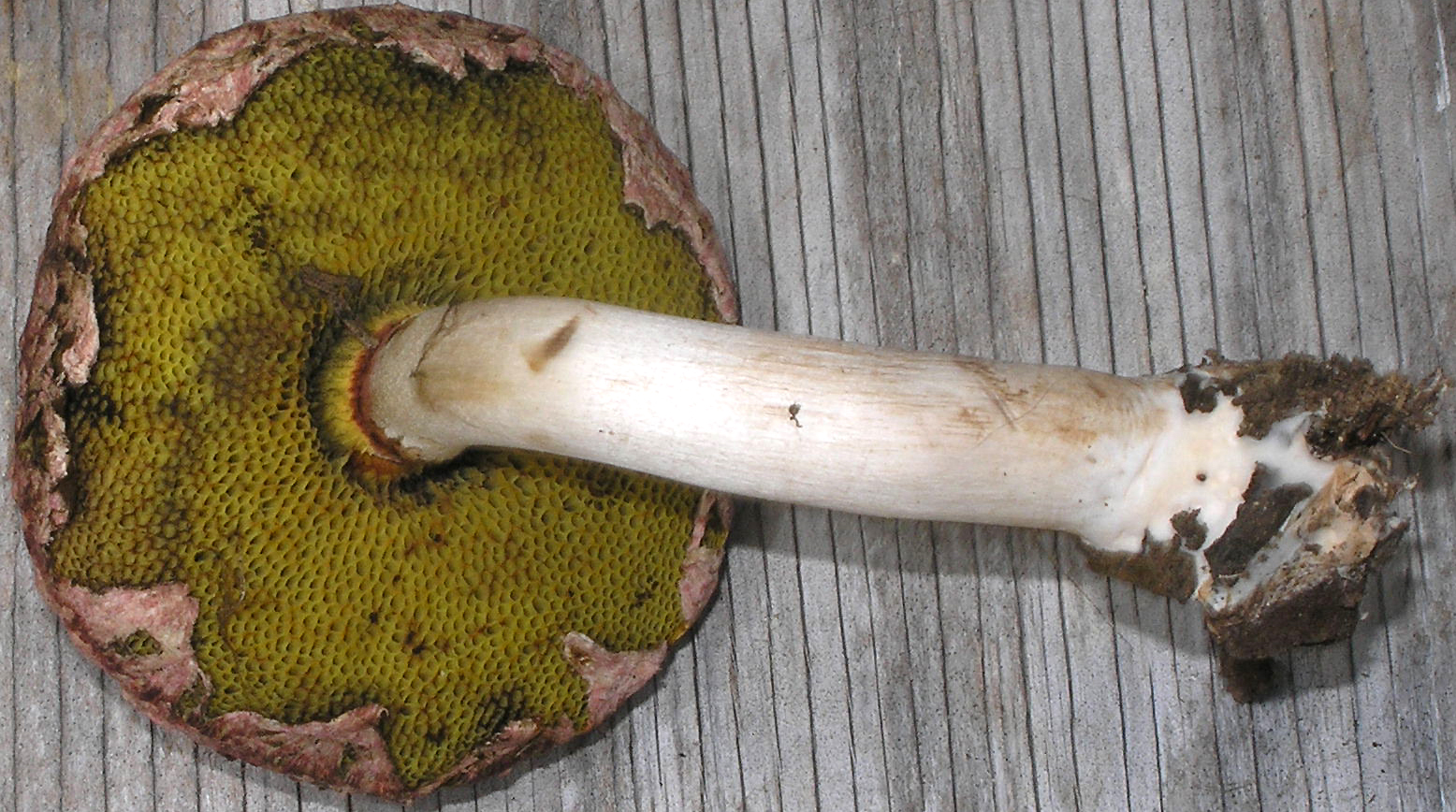
Marginal appendiculae, remnants of the partial veil, are evident on the underside of the cap.

The cap of B. ananas is 3.3–10 cm (1 1/4–4 in) wide and plano-convex (flat on one side and rounded on the other). It is covered with squamules (small scales) that can be either pressed against the cap or curved back on itself. The squamules range in color from reddish brown to red-tan, to pink to pinkish gray, and they are more concentrated and more scaly in the center of the cap, extending out of cream to light orange-pink to light pink-red floccose ground. The margin clasps the stem when young; at maturity it separates into triangular veil remnants (appendiculae) that measure 6–12 by 3–10 mm. The color of these appendiculae range from buff-white to faint pink. The flesh is 2–3 mm thick at the edge of the cap, 7–10 mm over the tubes, and 11–18 mm centrally. It is buff white to light yellow, and quickly turns bluish upon exposure to air. The tubes are 1–5 mm long at the margin, 10–20 mm in the center, and 4–6 mm at the stem. They are broadly and deeply depressed around the stem, of irregular lengths, bright yellow to olive-yellow to mustard-yellow, and also rapidly turn blue upon exposure. The pores are the same color as the tubes, and rapidly turn blue-green with pressure; they are angular, and there are about 0.5–1.5 pores per mm. The stem is 5–10 cm (2–4 in) tall and 6–14 mm (1/4–1/2 in) wide, and gradually becomes larger towards the base to 10–19 mm. The top part of the stem is cream to pink, the middle finely longitudinally striate, with the striations darkening with handling, red-lavender to brown-red, lighter with age. Immediately above the basal tomentum the stem surface is cream-colored with few striations. The basal tomentum is made of stiff, coarse white hairs over the lower 6–50 mm. The flesh of the stem is solid (i.e., not hollow) white to buff-tan to light yellow, and turns slightly blue with exposure. The odor is not distinctive (although it has been described as "musty") and the taste is mild.

=== Microscopic characteristics ===
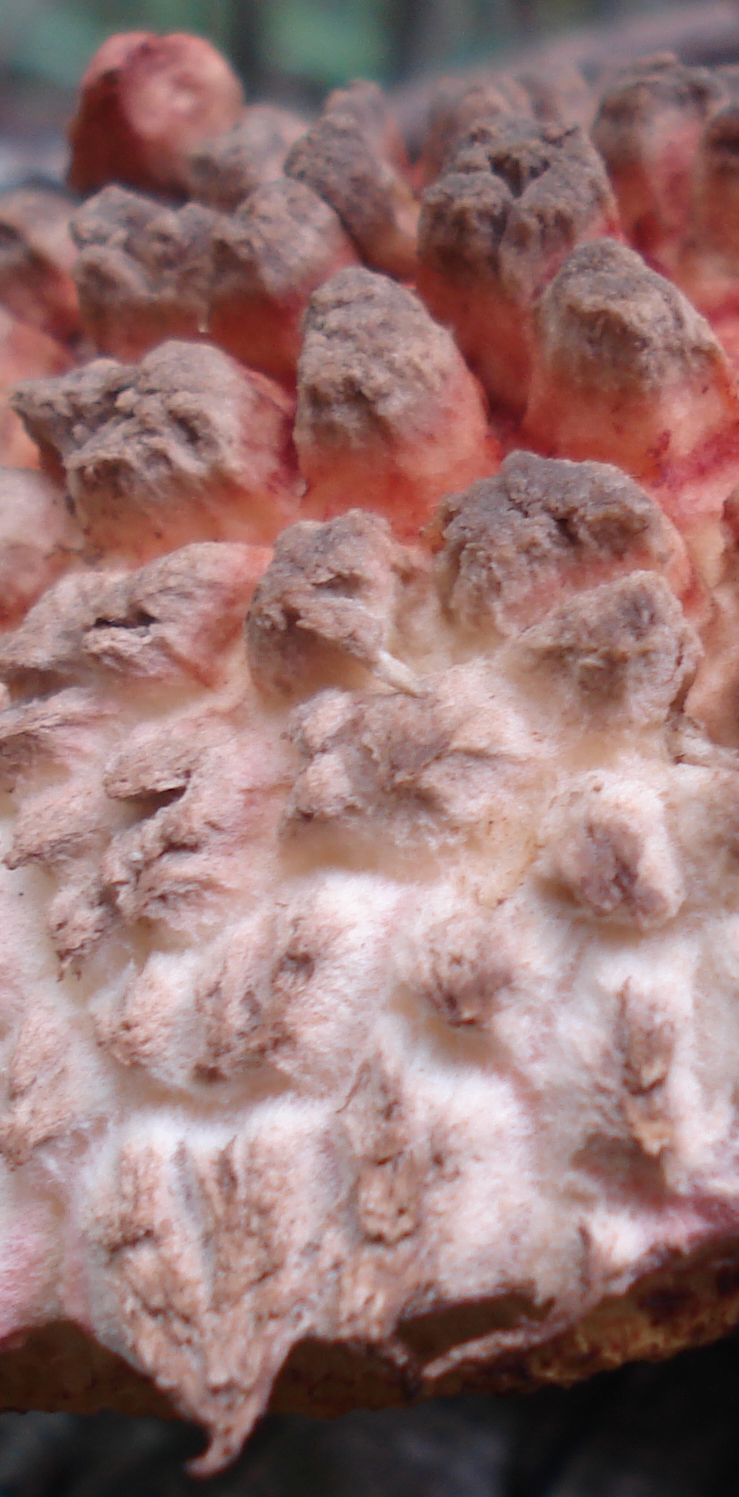
Closeup of cap surface revealing gradual differences in squamule structure and pigmentation progressing from the center of cap (top) to the margin

The spores are olivaceous-brown in medium to heavy deposit. They are inamyloid, almond-shaped, contain one or more oil droplets, and measure 17.5–22.2 by 6.4–8 μm. The spore wall is 0.5–1 μm thick, with 12–14 longitudinal ridges. These ridges are less than 1 μm tall, occasionally bifurcating, converging at poles, with minute cross-striae. Although these cross-striae are visible when observed with light microscopy, they are not evident when viewed with scanning electron microscopy. The hilar appendage (the region of a spore which attaches to the basidium via the sterigma) is 0.3–1 μm long. The basidia are four-spored, club-shaped, and have numerous refractive globules; they measure 39–57 by 11–15 μm. The pleurocystidia (cystidia on the face of a gill) are 42–47 by 8-12 μm, swollen and beaked, slightly capitate. They are abundant, arising from the subhymenium, projecting 19.3–29.6 μm above the hymenial palisade, thin-walled, hyaline, and devoid of refractive contents. The cheilocystidia (cystidia on the edge of a gill) are 19–42 by 5–11 μm, swollen, cylindrical to narrowly cub-shaped, thin-walled, and infrequent. The flesh of the hymenium is boletoid and strongly divergent (composed of different tissue layers). The mediostratum (middle tissue layer) is 24.7–45.7 μm wide, and made of many parallel, slightly interwoven hyphae. The lateral stratum hyphae are 4.4–8.4 μm wide, hyaline, gelatinized in a dilute solution of potassium hydroxide (KOH), and regularly septate. The cap cuticle is a densely interwoven trichodermial palisade (an erect, roughly parallel chains of closely packed cells) of cylindrical elements with inflated terminal cells. The terminal cells are 23.5–51.9 by 9.4–16.8 μm, inamyloid, cylindrical to club-shaped, interwoven, and concentrated on the squamules. The marginal appendiculae are composed of wefts of interwoven inflated hyphae, some with faint golden spirally arranged encrusting pigments that are evident when mounted in water, KOH, and Melzer's reagent. The flesh of the cap is composed of highly interwoven hyphae measuring 7.4–11.1 μm wide that are hyaline in water, gelatinized and hyaline in KOH, and regularly septate. The stipitipellis (stem cuticle) is a trichodermial palisade of cylindrical elements with inflated terminal cells. The terminal cells project 30.4–63 μm, and they are cylindrical to club-shaped, occasionally with an abrupt tapering point. The flesh of the stem is made of densely interwoven hyphae that are 4.9–7.2 μm wide, with spirally arranged, faint golden encrusting pigments that can be seen in KOH, Melzer's reagent, and water. Clamp connections are absent in this species.

=== Varieties ===
The typical variety of B. ananas has consistently larger fruit bodies than B. ananas var. minor Singer from Brazil and Nicaragua, and lacks the thick-walled cheilocystidia of B. ananas var. crassotunicatus Singer from Nicaragua and Panama.

=== Similar species ===
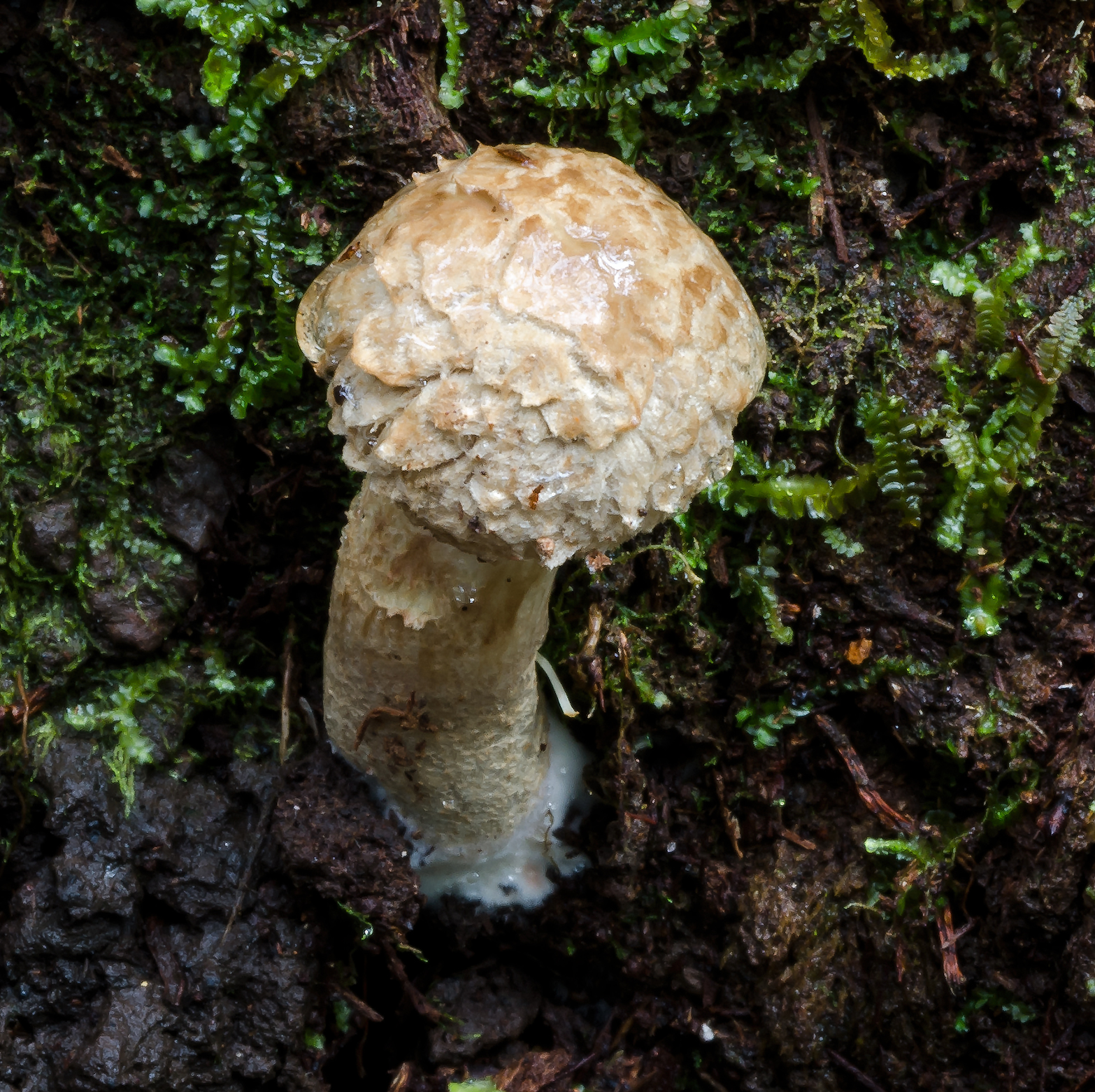
Boletellus ananiceps

Strobilomyces strobilaceus is roughly similar in appearance because of its rough scaly cap and lacerated margin, but may be distinguished from B. ananas by smooth stem without a ring, different spores, and flesh that is less tough. The Australian species Boletellus ananiceps has spores with narrow longitudinal ribs that do not have cross-striae. B. dissiliens has colors that are not red as in B. ananas, and pores that can become reddish in maturity. Further, the cap flesh of B. dissiliens turns blue upon exposure to air.

== Ecology, habitat and distribution ==
The fruit bodies of B. ananas typically grow scattered or in groups under oak and pine trees, often on their bases. In Guyana, the mushroom typically fruits singly or in pairs within 1–2 m (3 1/2–6 1/2 ft) above ground level on the trunks of the tropical tree Dicymbe corymbosa (subfamily Caesalpinioideae), associated with ectomycorrhizas within humic accumulations. It is rarely found fruiting on the ground on heavily decayed, root-penetrated wood. Rolf Singer suggested that the fungus was not mycorrhizal, noting that as well as occurring under or on the bases of both pine and oaks, it occurred in scanty humus and debris accumulated on rock walls. Singer concluded that the species prefers to grow on hard surfaces. Harry D. Thiers, in his study of the bolete flora of Texas, wrote that B. ananas was a rare species that often fruited abundantly following an extended period of rain and high humidity.

Some varieties of B. ananas from southeastern North America, Costa Rica, Brazil, Panama, Nicaragua, and Guyana have been noted to fruit on tree trunks, although terrestrial fruiting has been reported in Malaysia and Central America. Due to the typically elevated fruiting habit and occurrence on dead wood, the ectomycorrhizal status of B. ananas has been debated; in the protolog Murrill noted "it always occurs either as a wound parasite on pine trunks or about the base of living pine trees". All collections have been made in association with ectotrophic host trees including Pinus and Quercus species in southeastern North America and Central America, Quercus humboldtii in Colombia, various Fagaceae and Dipterocarpaceae species in Malaysia, and Leptospermum and Pinus species in New Zealand. In Guyana, the humic deposits on Dicymbe trunks bearing B. ananas are consistently permeated with abundant ectomycorrhizas. The fungus was reported as forming mycorrhizal associations with eucalypts in Australia, based on fruit body association with trees.

Its North American distribution encompasses a range extending north from North Carolina to Florida, west to Texas and south to Mexico, and Central America; it is in season from June to October. In 2008, it was reported for the first time in the Upper Potaro and Upper Ireng River Basins in Guyana. It has also been collected from New Zealand, Asia (including China, Korea, Malaysia, and Taiwan), and possibly Australia.

== Edibility ==
Although the mushroom is used as a food in Mexico, field guides list it as "inedible" or "not recommended".

== See also ==
- List of North American boletes
