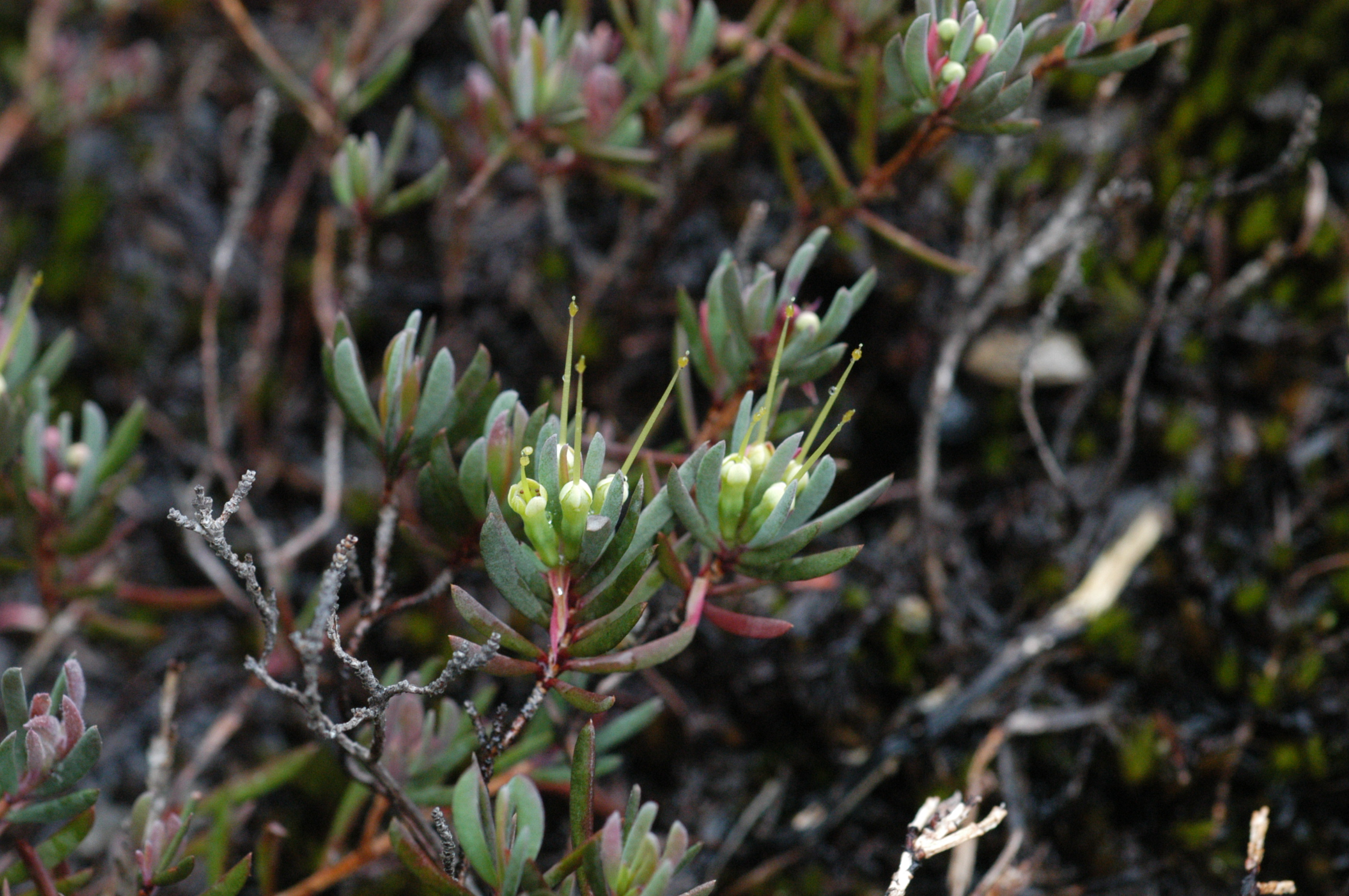

Scientific classification
- Kingdom: Plantae
- Clade: Tracheophytes
- Clade: Angiosperms
- Clade: Eudicots
- Clade: Rosids
- Order: Myrtales
- Family: Myrtaceae
- Genus: Darwinia
- Species: D. glaucophylla

Binomial name
- Darwinia glaucophylla B.G.Briggs
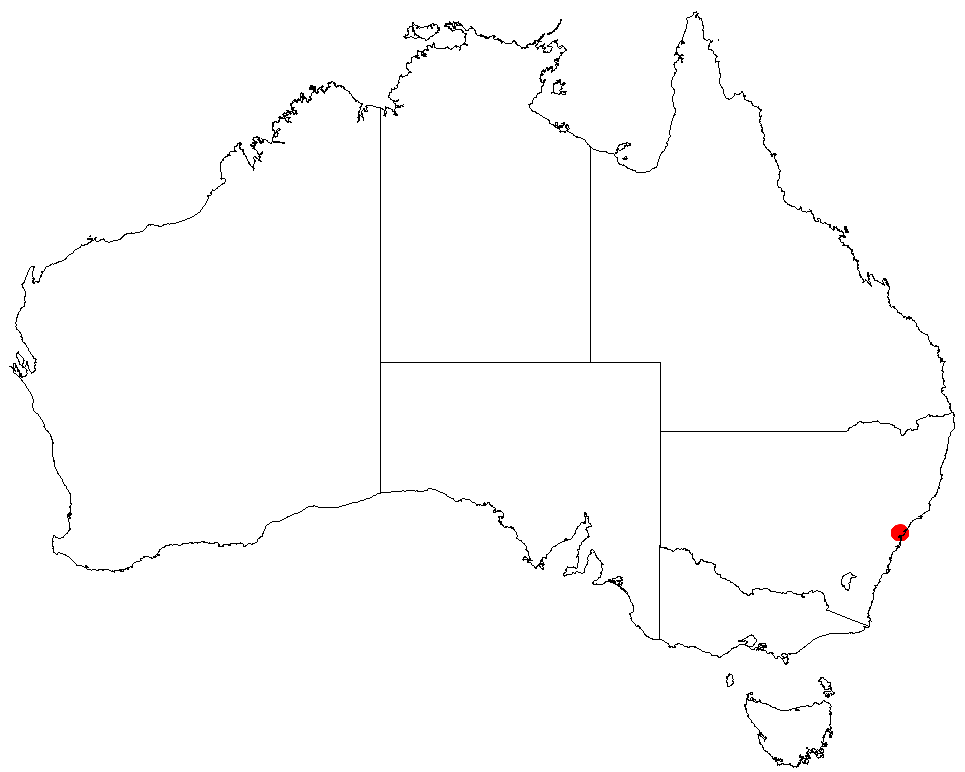
- Occurrence data from AVH

= Darwinia glaucophylla =

Species of flowering plant

Darwinia glaucophylla is a plant in the myrtle family Myrtaceae which grows as a prostrate shrub, sometimes forming extensive mats. It has bluish green leaves and white flowers in small groups which fade to reddish pink as they age. It is only known from about fifteen sites in the Gosford area and is listed as "threatened" in New South Wales legislation.

== Description ==
Darwinia glaucophylla is a prostrate shrub but with erect side branches which reach to a height of 15 cm (6 in). The leaves are arranged in opposite pairs and are bluish green with a reddish tinge, glabrous, 8–17 mm (0.3–0.7 in) long and triangular in cross section. The flowers are arranged mostly in groups of between two and four, the groups on a stalk about 1 mm (0.04 in) long. There are leaf-like bracts 8–12 mm (0.3–0.5 in) long and reddish brown bracteoles at the base of the groups but which fall off as the flowers develop. The floral cup is 7–8 mm (0.28–0.31 in) long, about 1 mm (0.04 in) wide and has distinct ribs. The sepals are 0.5 mm (0.02 in) or less long and much shorter than the petals. The style is straight, white and 12–16 mm (0.5–0.6 in) long. Flowering occurs from July to November and is followed by fruit which is a tiny capsule containing a single seed 1.5 mm (0.06 in) in diameter.

== Taxonomy and naming ==
Darwinia glaucophylla was first formally described in 1962 by Barbara Briggs from a specimen she collected near Kariong and the description was published in Contributions from the New South Wales National Herbarium. The specific epithet (glaucophylla) is derived from the Ancient Greek words glaukos meaning "bluish-green" or "gray" and phyllon meaning "leaf".

Hybrids between this species and D. fascicularis are known, but are easily recognised as they have a more erect habit.

== Distribution and habitat ==
This darwinia grows in heath and open forest in soils derived from sandstone. It is only known from about fifteen sites near Calga, Kariong and Somersby.

== Conservation ==
Darwinia glaucophylla is classified as "threatened" under the New South Wales Biodiversity Conservation Act 2016. The main threats to the species are habitat degradation, inappropriate fire regimes and extension of a nearby sand mine. Some research suggests that the species may benefit from mowing and appropriate use of burning.
