= Boletellus exiguus =

Scientific classification
- Domain: Eukaryota
- Kingdom: Fungi
- Division: Basidiomycota
- Class: Agaricomycetes
- Order: Boletales
- Family: Boletaceae
- Genus: Boletellus
- Species: B. exiguus

Binomial name
- Boletellus exiguus T.W.Henkel & Fulgenzi (2008)

Species of fungus

Boletellus exiguus is a species of bolete fungus in the family Boletaceae. Found in the tropical forests of western Guyana, it was reported as new to science in 2008. The specific epithet exiguus derives from the Latin word for "small", referring to the small basidiocarps.

== Description ==
The fruit bodies have convex to somewhat flattened caps, reaching a typical diameter of 9–33 mm (0.35–1.30 in), although specimens up to 42 mm (1.7 in) have been recorded. The dark brown cap colour of youth softens in age to become chestnut-brown to yellow-tan. On the underside of the cap is a yellow pore surface. There are between 0.5 and 2 somewhat angular pores per millimetre. The tubes comprising the hymenophore are up to 7 mm (0.3 in) long; they are depressed around the point of attachment to the stipe. The tube tissue quickly stains blueish-green when injured. The stipe measures 7–34 mm (0.3–1.3 in) long by 1–4 mm thick. It is more or less equal in width throughout its length except for a slightly flared base. Its color is tan to brownish, with a red zone at the top 1–2 mm, and its surface texture features fine longitudinal striations, and brown "hairs" at the very base, The fruit body odor ranges from minimal to "pleasant", and it has a mild taste.

The spore print is olive-brown to dark olive-green. Spores are walnut shaped, inamyloid, and typically measure 10–15 by 7–9 μm. The basidia are somewhat club-shaped, three- or four-spored with sterigmata 2–4 um long, and overall dimensions of 37–51 by 12–15 μm.

== Habitat and distribution ==
Boletellus exiguus is known only from the type locality in Guyana, in the Upper Potaro and adjacent Upper Ireng River Basins. Fruit bodies grow singly to scattered in humus on the trunks of Dicymbe corymbosa.
