= Cortinarius walkeri =

Scientific classification
- Domain: Eukaryota
- Kingdom: Fungi
- Division: Basidiomycota
- Class: Agaricomycetes
- Order: Agaricales
- Family: Cortinariaceae
- Genus: Cortinarius
- Species: C. walkeri

Binomial name
- Cortinarius walkeri Cooke and Massee

Species of fungus

Cortinarius walkeri is a basidiomycete fungus of the genus Cortinarius native to Australia. It was first described by Mordecai Cubitt Cooke and George Edward Massee in 1893 from a specimen collected by Anna Frances Walker in the Blue Mountains, and named in her honour.

== See also ==
- List of Cortinarius species
