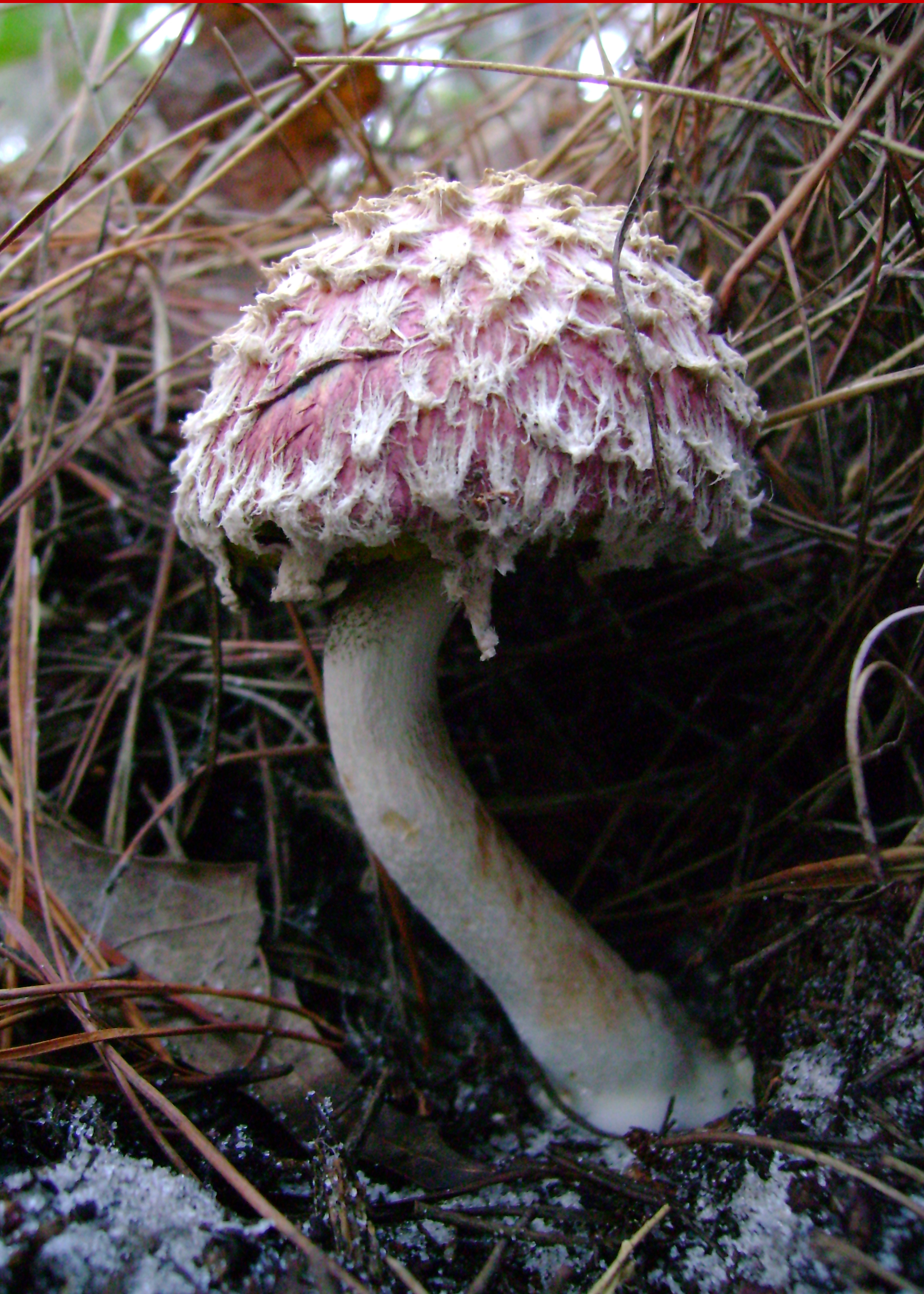
- Boletellus ananas

Scientific classification
- Kingdom: Fungi
- Division: Basidiomycota
- Class: Agaricomycetes
- Order: Boletales
- Family: Boletaceae
- Genus: Boletellus; Murrill (1909)

Type species
- Boletellus ananas (M.A.Curtis) Murrill (1909)

= Boletellus =

Genus of fungi

Boletellus is a genus of fungi in the family Boletaceae. The genus has a widespread distribution, especially in subtropical regions, and contains about 50 species. The genus was first described by American mycologist William Alphonso Murrill in 1909. The genus name means "small Boletus".

== Description ==
According to Murrill's definition of the genus, species of Boletellus have an annual fruit body that grows on wood and a stem that is centrally placed. The cap surface is floccose-verrucose (covered with tufts of hairs or warts) and yellowish. The fruit body flesh is light colored and fleshy. The tubes on the underside of the cap are angular, depressed, yellowish, and covered with a partial veil. The spores of Boletellus are oblong to ellipsoid, smooth, and rust-colored. The stem is solid (i.e., not hollow), white, and not reticulate. Additional characteristics of the genus have been delineated or amended since its original description over 100 years ago: spores have longitudinal ridges or "wings", are inamyloid, and rarely dextrinoid (staining deep reddish to reddish brown in Melzer's reagent). Species usually have hymenial cystidia present, and clamp connections are typically absent (with the exception of B. fibuliger).

Murrill placed Boletellus ananas (formerly Boletus ananas) as the sole and type species. Singer's fourth edition (1986) of his Agaricales in Modern Taxonomy included 33 species, which were classified into sections depending on moisture content, scaliness of the cap or amount of ornamentation on the stem. Although some species of Boletellus are rated as edible, none are considered choice.

== Similar genera ==
In general, Boletes usually have smooth spores, but Boletellus, Austroboletus, Strobilomyces, and Heimioporus are exceptions to this. Hemioporus species have pitted or reticulate spores, Strobilomyces species have spiny and reticulate spores, and Austroboletus species have pitted spores, in comparison to the ridged spores of Boletellus species.

== Species ==
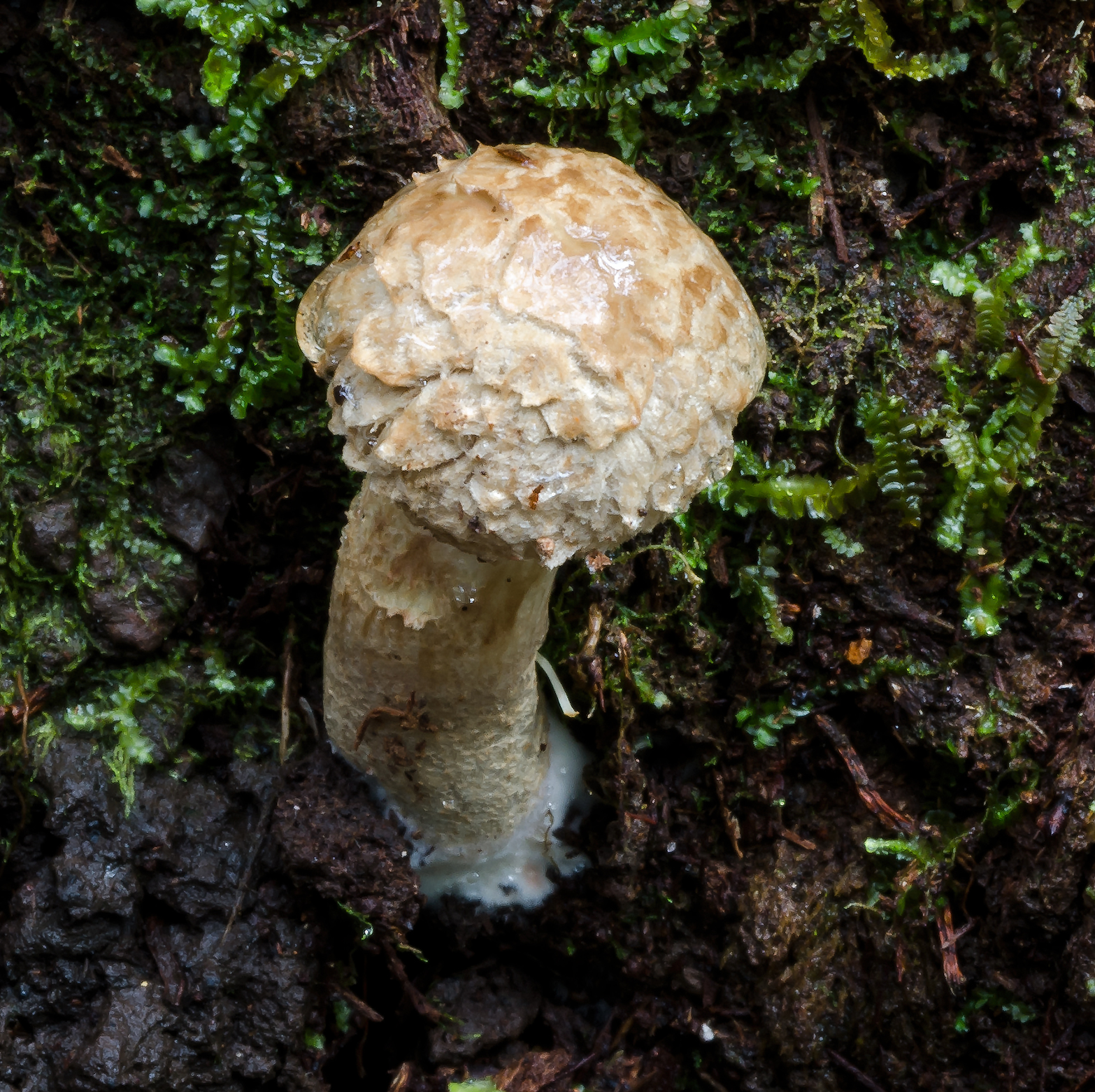
B. ananaeceps

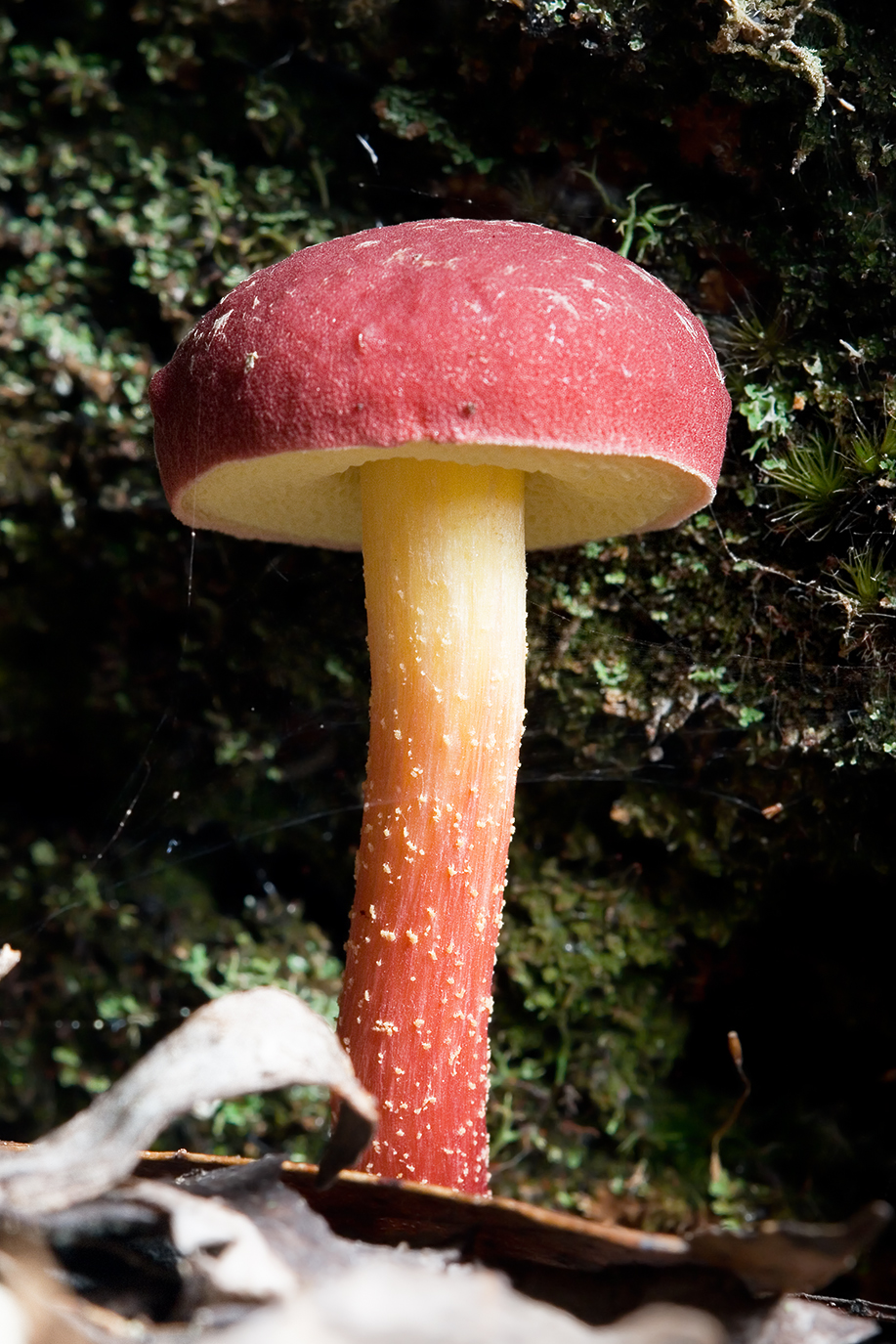
B. obscurecoccineus

Here is a list of some species currently accepted in the genus Boletellus:

- B. ananiceps (Berk.) Singer
- B. ananas (M.A. Curtis) Murr.
- B. areolatus Hirot. Sato
- B. aurocontextus Hirot. Sato
- B. badiovinosus Horak
- B. belizensis B. Ortiz & T.J. Baroni
- B. brunoflavus Z.J. Lin, X.X. Huang, Y.S. Liang & L.H. Qiu
- B. cardinalicus Heim & Perreau
- B. cerasinus Heim & Perreau
- B. chrysenteroides (Snell) Singer
- B. cremeovelosus A. Barbosa-Silva & F. Wartchow
- B. cubensis (Berk. & Curt.) Sing.
- B. cyanescens Horak
- B. deceptivus Halling & Fechner
- B. dicymbophilus Fulgenzi & T.W. Henkel
- B. dissiliens (Corner) Pegler & Young
- B. dicymbophilus Fulgenzi & T.W. Henkel
- B. domingensis B. Ortiz & T.J. Baroni
- B. elatus Nagasawa
- B. emodensis (Berk.) Sing.
- B. episcopalis Heim & Perreau
- B. exiguus T.W. Henkel & Fulgenzi
- B. fanjingensis H.A. Wen
- B. fibuliger Singer
- B. flocculosipes (Murr.) Perreau
- B. floriformis Imazeki
- B. immutabilis (Bouriquet) Perreau
- B. jalapensis (Murr.) Gilb.
- B. lepidospora E.-J. Gilbert ex Heinem.
- B. lepidosporus Gilb. ex Heinem.
- B. lignicolus K.W. Yeh & Z.C. Chen
- B. linderi Singer
- B. longipes Heinem.
- B. nordestinus A.C. Magnago
- B. obscurecoccineus (v. Höhn.) Singer
- B. piakaii T.W. Henkel & Fulgenzi
- B. plurigibbus Heim & Perreau
- B. pseudochrysenteroides Smith & Thiers
- B. pustulatus (Beeli) Gilb.
- B. putuoensis Chang Xu, Xu Zhang, Yun-Xia Chen, Rou Xue, Zhi-Fang Le, Jian-Rui Wang, Yi Li & Nian-Kai Zeng
- B. radiatus C. S. Bi
- B. reminiscens Halling & Fechner
- B. rubrolutescens Heinem. & Rammeloo
- B. rubroviolaceus Heinem. & Goossens
- B. rufescens (Cooke & Massee) Singer
- B. serpentipileus M. Zang & M.S. Yuan
- B. shoreae A. Parihar, K. Das & Vizzini
- B. sinapipes Fechner, K.Syme, R.Rob. & Halling
- B. singerii Gonz.-Velázq. & R. Valenz.
- B. squamatus (Berk.) Singer
- B. squamosus M. Zang
- B. umbrinellus (Pat. & Baker) Singer et al.
- B. velutinus Heinem. & Rammeloo
- B. violaceiporus G. Stevenson
- B. violaceus M. Zang & H. C. Tan
- B. vulgaris C.S. Bi
- B. wenshanensis G. Wu & Xin Zhang
- B. yunnanensis M. Zang

== See also ==
- Boletellus ananas
