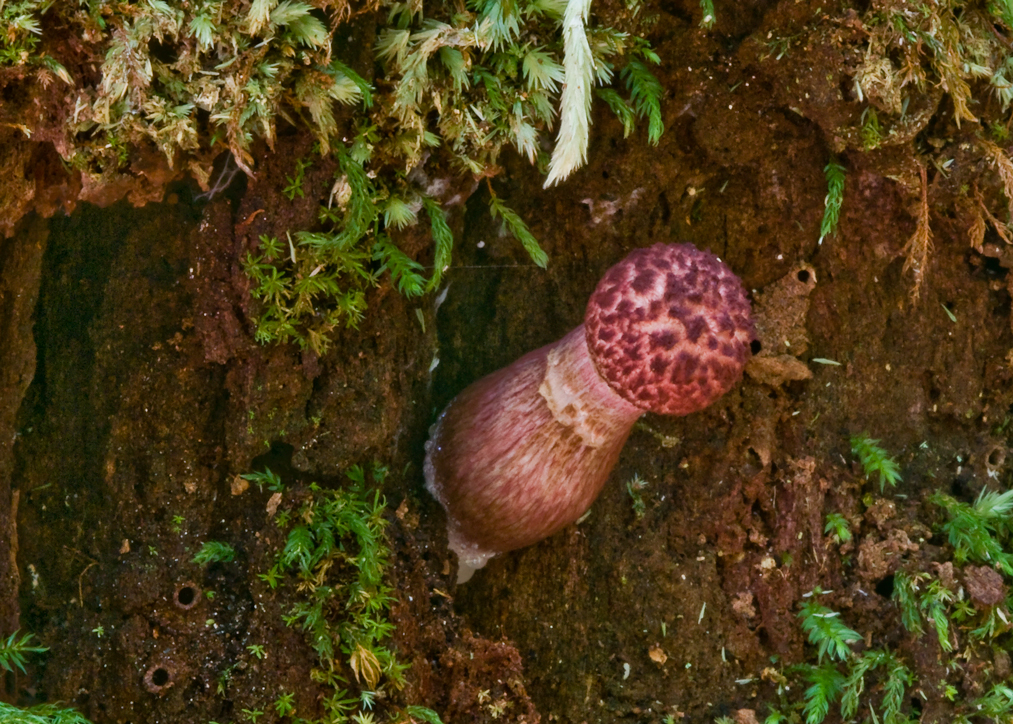

Scientific classification
- Domain: Eukaryota
- Kingdom: Fungi
- Division: Basidiomycota
- Class: Agaricomycetes
- Order: Boletales
- Family: Boletaceae
- Genus: Boletellus
- Species: B. emodensis

Binomial name
- Boletellus emodensis (Berk.) Singer (1942)

Synonyms
- Boletus emodensis Berk. (1851)

= Boletellus emodensis =

Species of fungus

Boletellus emodensis, commonly known as the shaggy cap, is a species of fungus in the family Boletaceae. It was described by English mycologist Miles Joseph Berkeley in 1851 as Boletus emodensis, and transferred to Boletellus by Rolf Singer in 1942. Characterised by a distinctive reddish shaggy cap, it grows in eucalypt woodlands. It produces a brown spore print, and has fusiform (spindle-shaped) spores that are 16–20 by 7–9 μm with longitudinal grooves. It is similar in appearance to Boletellus ananiceps, but the latter species is scaly rather than shaggy, has a pinkish tint, and lacks grooves in the spores.
