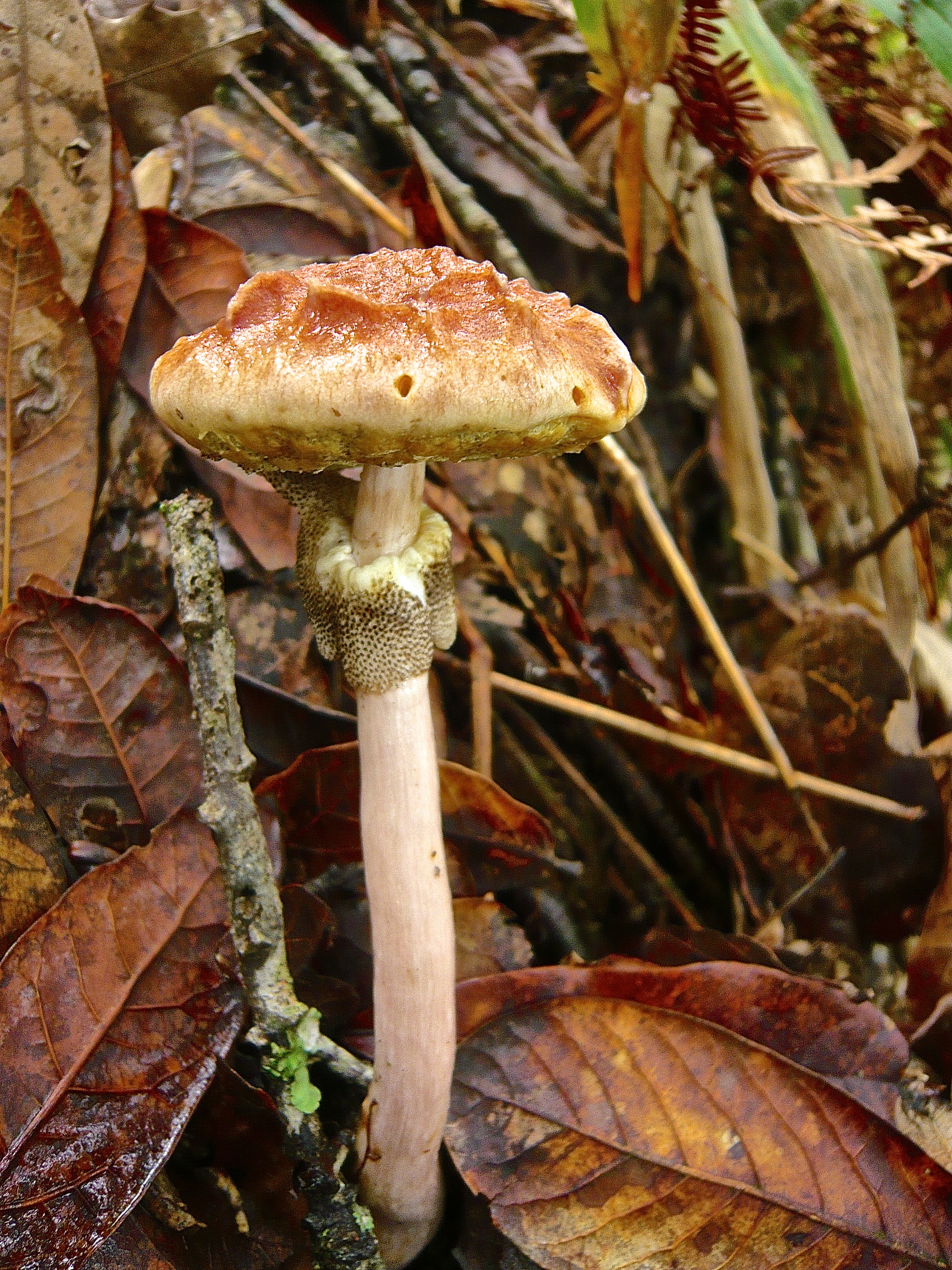

Scientific classification
- Domain: Eukaryota
- Kingdom: Fungi
- Division: Basidiomycota
- Class: Agaricomycetes
- Order: Boletales
- Family: Boletaceae
- Genus: Boletellus
- Species: B. jalapensis

Binomial name
- Boletellus jalapensis (Murrill) E.-J.Gilbert (1931)

Synonyms
- Ceriomyces jalapensis Murrill (1910); Boletogaster jalapensis (Murrill) Lohwag (1937)

= Boletellus jalapensis =

Species of fungus

Boletellus jalapensis is a species of fungus in the family Boletaceae. Originally described under the name Ceriomyces jalapensis by William Alphonso Murrill in 1910, it was transferred to the genus Boletellus in 1931. It is known from Mexico and Costa Rica.
