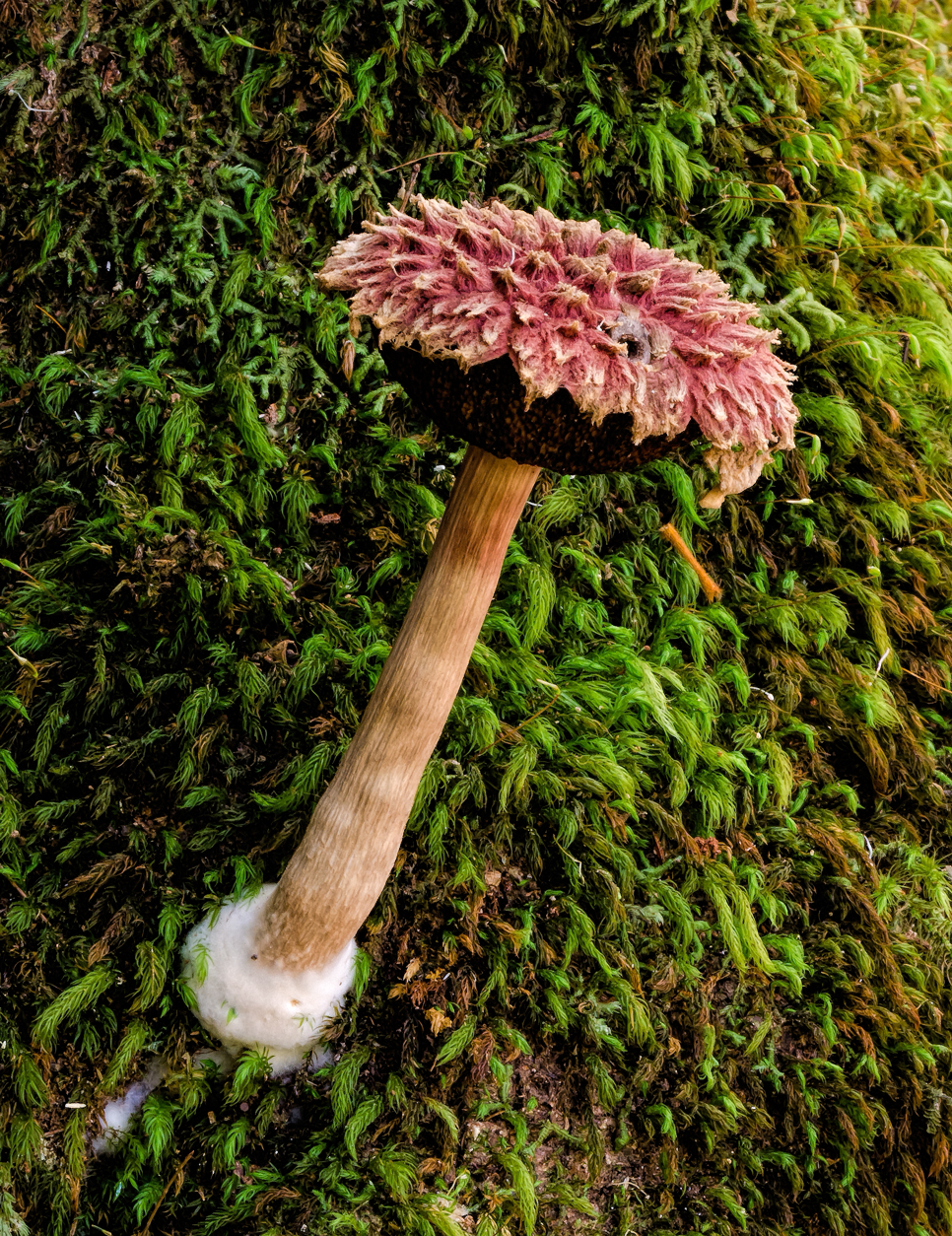

Scientific classification
- Domain: Eukaryota
- Kingdom: Fungi
- Division: Basidiomycota
- Class: Agaricomycetes
- Order: Boletales
- Family: Boletaceae
- Genus: Boletellus
- Species: B. deceptivus

Binomial name
- Boletellus deceptivus Halling & N.A. Fechner (2015)

= Boletellus deceptivus =

Species of fungus

Boletellus deceptivus is a species of bolete fungus in the family Boletaceae. Found in eastern Australia and Papua New Guinea.
