= Boletellus cyanescens =

Scientific classification
- Kingdom: Fungi
- Division: Basidiomycota
- Class: Agaricomycetes
- Order: Boletales
- Family: Boletaceae
- Genus: Boletellus
- Species: B. cyanescens

Binomial name
- Boletellus cyanescens E.Horak (1977)

Species of fungus

Boletellus cyanescens is a species of fungus in the family Boletaceae. Found in Papua New Guinea, it was described as new to science by the Austrian mycologist Egon Horak in 1977.
