= Boletellus belizensis =

Scientific classification
- Domain: Eukaryota
- Kingdom: Fungi
- Division: Basidiomycota
- Class: Agaricomycetes
- Order: Boletales
- Family: Boletaceae
- Genus: Boletellus
- Species: B. belizensis

Binomial name
- Boletellus belizensis B.Ortiz & T.J.Baroni (2007)

Species of fungus

Boletellus belizensis is a species of bolete fungus in the family Boletaceae. Found in Belize, it was described as new to science in 2007.
