= Boletellus fibuliger =

Scientific classification
- Domain: Eukaryota
- Kingdom: Fungi
- Division: Basidiomycota
- Class: Agaricomycetes
- Order: Boletales
- Family: Boletaceae
- Genus: Boletellus
- Species: B. fibuliger

Binomial name
- Boletellus fibuliger Singer (1983)

Species of fungus

Boletellus fibuliger is a species of fungus in the family Boletaceae. Found in Venezuela, it was described as new to science in 1983 by mycologist Rolf Singer.
