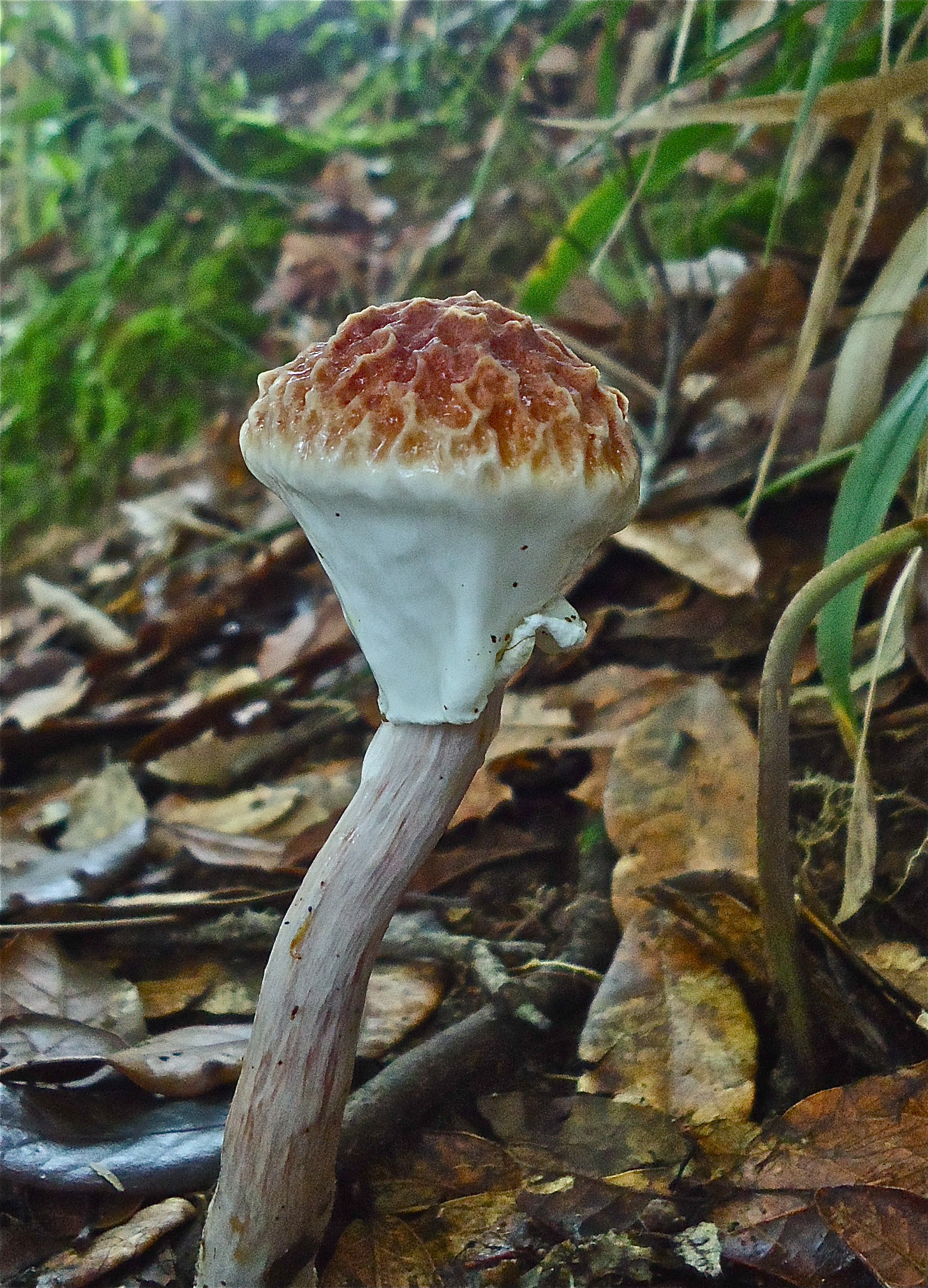

Scientific classification
- Kingdom: Fungi
- Division: Basidiomycota
- Class: Agaricomycetes
- Order: Boletales
- Family: Boletaceae
- Genus: Boletellus
- Species: B. singerii

Binomial name
- Boletellus singerii Gonz.-Velázq. & R.Valenz. (1995)

= Boletellus singerii =

Species of fungus

Boletellus singeri is a species of fungus in the family Boletaceae. It is known from Mexico, where it was collected from Sierra Nanchititla in the municipality of Tejupilco. The species is named after American mycologist Rolf Singer.
