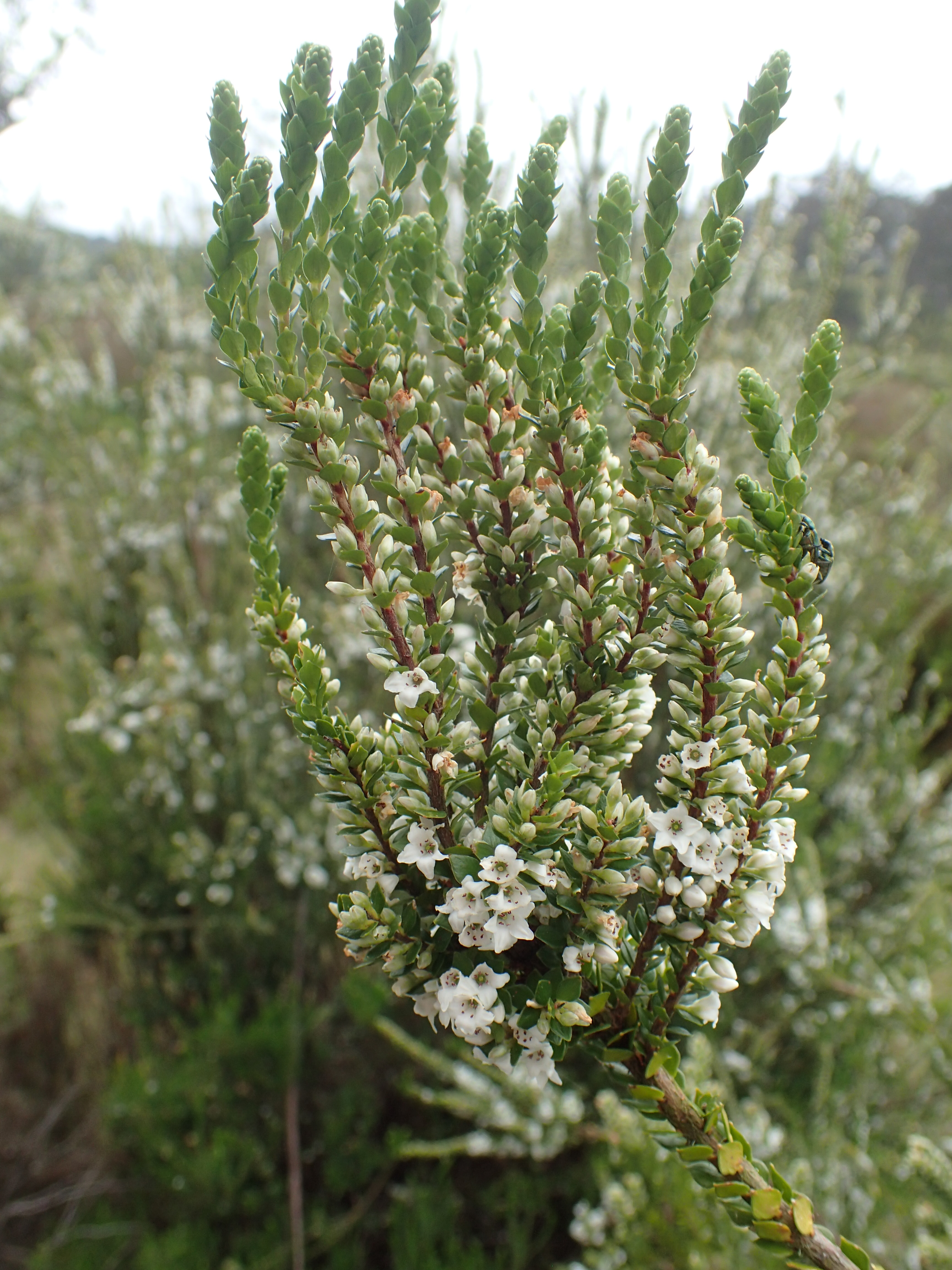
- In Barrington Tops National Park

Scientific classification
- Kingdom: Plantae
- Clade: Tracheophytes
- Clade: Angiosperms
- Clade: Eudicots
- Clade: Asterids
- Order: Ericales
- Family: Ericaceae
- Genus: Epacris
- Species: E. rhombifolia

Binomial name
- Epacris rhombifolia (L.R.Fraser & Vickery) Menadue

Synonyms
- Epacris microphylla var. rhombifolia L.R.Fraser & Vickery

= Epacris rhombifolia =

Mountain coral heath

Species of flowering plant

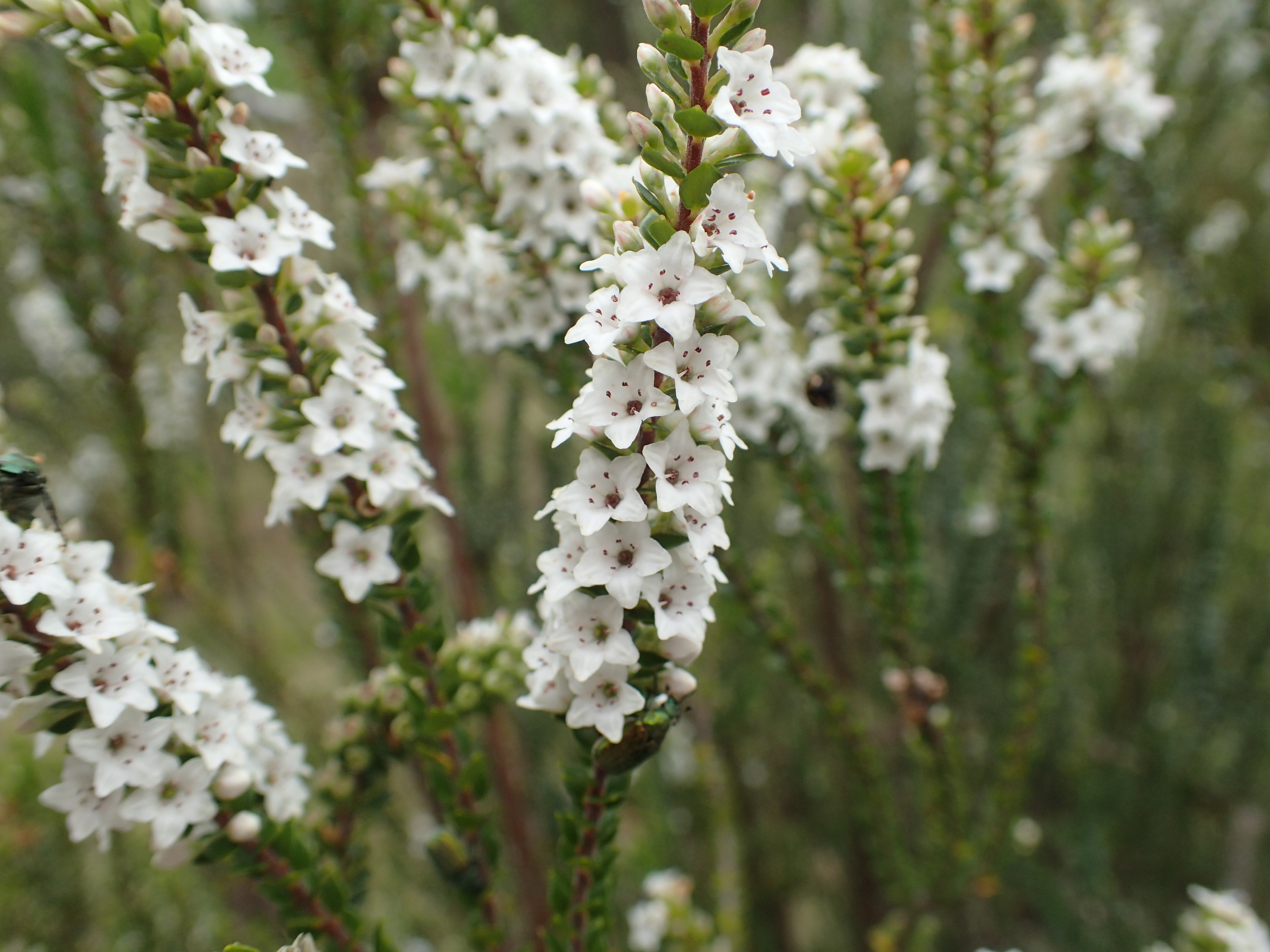
Close-up of flowers

Epacris rhombifolia commonly known as mountain coral heath, is a plant in the heath family Ericaceae and is endemic to eastern Australia. It is an erect, multi-stemmed shrub with broad, rhombic leaves and white flowers with four petals, the flowers spreading down the branches. It only grows in wet, subalpine heath and is sometimes regarded as a variety of Epacris microphylla.

== Description ==
Epacris rhombifolia is an erect shrub with several main stems and that typically grows to a height of up to 2 2 m (6 ft 7 in). Its young stems are reddish-brown and covered with short, soft, downy hairs when young. The leaves are rhombic, 2.0–4.5 mm (0.079–0.177 in) long and 1.5–3.5 mm (0.059–0.138 in) wide, more or less flat and overlapping each other when young. They are glabrous, have indistinct veins and a petiole 0.3–0.8 mm (0.012–0.031 in) long. The flowers are white, 3.8–5 mm (0.15–0.20 in) wide and arranged in leaf axils, spreading down the branches and have white petals forming a bell-shaped tube. The buds are surrounded by 16 to 20 white, egg-shaped bracts and white, egg-shaped sepals 1.5–2.5 mm (0.059–0.098 in) long and longer than the petal tube. The petal tube is about 1 mm (0.039 in) long, 1.5–2.0 mm (0.059–0.079 in) wide and the lobes are about 1.7 mm (0.067 in) long and do not overlap. Flowering occurs from December to March and the fruit that follows are capsules about 2 mm (0.079 in) long and wide.

== Taxonomy and naming ==
Mountain coral heath was first formally described in 1810 by Lilian Fraser and Joyce Vickery, who gave it the name Epacris microphylla var. rhombifolia. The description was published in Journal and Proceedings of the Linnean Society of New South Wales. The variety was raised to species level in 2015 by Yvonne Menadue and Ron Crowden. The specific epithet (rhombifolia) is derived from the Latin words rhombus meaning "an equilateral parallelogram with unequal pairs of angles" and folium meaning "leaf".

== Distribution and habitat ==
Epacris rhombifolia grows in wet heath in subalpine areas of Lake Mountain, Mount Baw Baw and the ranges north of Licola in Victoria and in the Barrington Tops, Wingello and Oberon districts of New South Wales.

== Conservation status ==
This species of Epacris is listed as "endangered" under the Victorian Government Flora and Fauna Guarantee Act 1988.

== Use in horticulture ==
Mountain coral heath has horticultural merit with its display of dainty flowers. It is suitable for a small, permanently moist, sheltered garden and can be grown in containers.
