= Boletellus piakaii =

Scientific classification
- Kingdom: Fungi
- Division: Basidiomycota
- Class: Agaricomycetes
- Order: Boletales
- Family: Boletaceae
- Genus: Boletellus
- Species: B. piakaii

Binomial name
- Boletellus piakaii T.W.Henkel & Fulgenzi (2008)

Species of fungus

Boletellus piakaii is a species of fungus in the family Boletaceae. It was found in Guyana and described in 2008.
