= Boletellus badiovinosus =

Scientific classification
- Kingdom: Fungi
- Division: Basidiomycota
- Class: Agaricomycetes
- Order: Boletales
- Family: Boletaceae
- Genus: Boletellus
- Species: B. badiovinosus

Binomial name
- Boletellus badiovinosus E.Horak (1977)

Species of fungus

Boletellus badiovinosus is a species of fungus in the family Boletaceae. Found in Papua New Guinea, it was described as new to science by Egon Horak in 1977.
