= Boletellus floriformis =

Scientific classification
- Kingdom: Fungi
- Division: Basidiomycota
- Class: Agaricomycetes
- Order: Boletales
- Family: Boletaceae
- Genus: Boletellus
- Species: B. floriformis

Binomial name
- Boletellus floriformis Imazeki (1952)

Species of fungus

Boletellus floriformis is a species of bolete fungus in the family Boletaceae. Found in Japan, it was described as new to science by Rokuya Imazeki in 1952.
