= Boletellus dicymbophilus =

Scientific classification
- Kingdom: Fungi
- Division: Basidiomycota
- Class: Agaricomycetes
- Order: Boletales
- Family: Boletaceae
- Genus: Boletellus
- Species: B. dicymbophilus

Binomial name
- Boletellus dicymbophilus Fulgenzi & T.W.Henkel (2008)

Species of fungus

Boletellus dicymbophilus is a species of fungus in the family Boletaceae. Found in Guyana, it was described as new to science in 2008.
