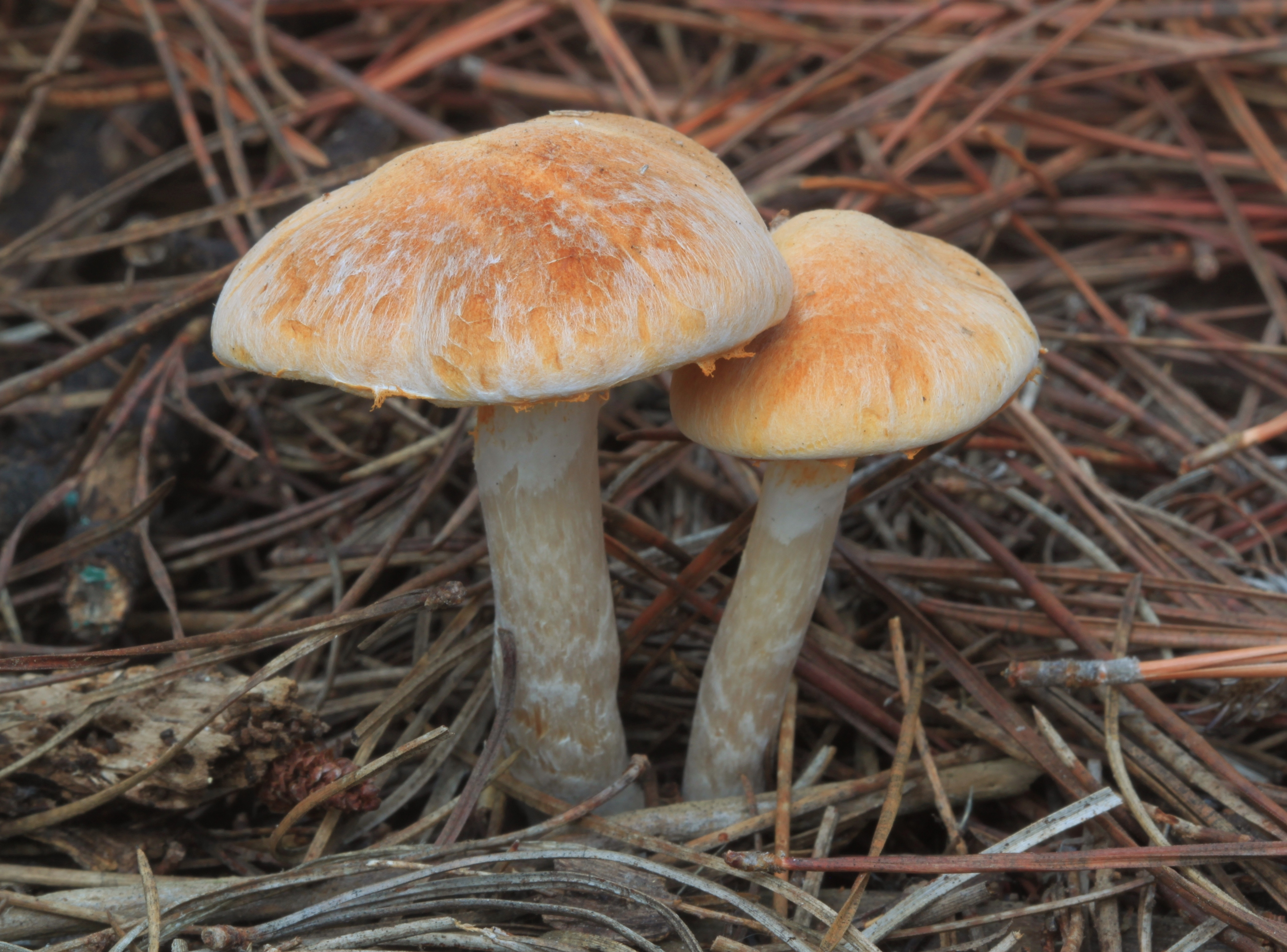

Scientific classification
- Domain: Eukaryota
- Kingdom: Fungi
- Division: Basidiomycota
- Class: Agaricomycetes
- Order: Agaricales
- Family: Hymenogastraceae
- Genus: Gymnopilus
- Species: G. allantopus

Binomial name
- Gymnopilus allantopus (Berk.) Pegler

= Gymnopilus allantopus =

Species of fungus

Gymnopilus allantopus Mycological characteristics
- Gills on hymenium
- Cap is convex
- Hymenium is adnexed or adnate
- Ecology is saprotrophic

Gymnopilus allantopus is a species of mushroom in the family Hymenogastraceae. It is commonly known as the golden wood fungus.

== Description ==
In Australia, Gymnopilus allantopus is extremely common in the Perth region, most often seen on fallen logs and branches of Banksia species. G. allantopus produces fruit bodies from May to July, and also produces masses of fan-like white mycelium in the wood of the trees it infects, which can be seen at any time of the year.

The fungus is easily identified in the field by its bright gills that develop rusty spots when old, a white flap on the margin of young caps, and white fan-like mycelium. It has a bright ochre brown spore print. Most often the fruit bodies have a straight stem but if the specimens emerge from the side of a log the stem curves upwards due to geotropism.

== Taxonomy ==
Previously in Western Australia, Gymnopilus allantopus was incorrectly referred to as the northern hemisphere species Gymnopilus penetrans. It was also given the provisional name Gymnopilus austrosapineus to distinguish small specimens from large ones sent in the 19th century from Australia to M. J. Berkeley in England. He named the large specimens as G. allantopus in 1845 and referred to it as a "very noble" species. Recent studies have revealed that Berkeley was sent only the largest specimens and he had wrongly assumed all specimens would be large-sized. Hence the name G. austrosapineus was determined to be superfluous because G. allantopus produces both small and large specimens.

== See also ==
- List of Gymnopilus species
