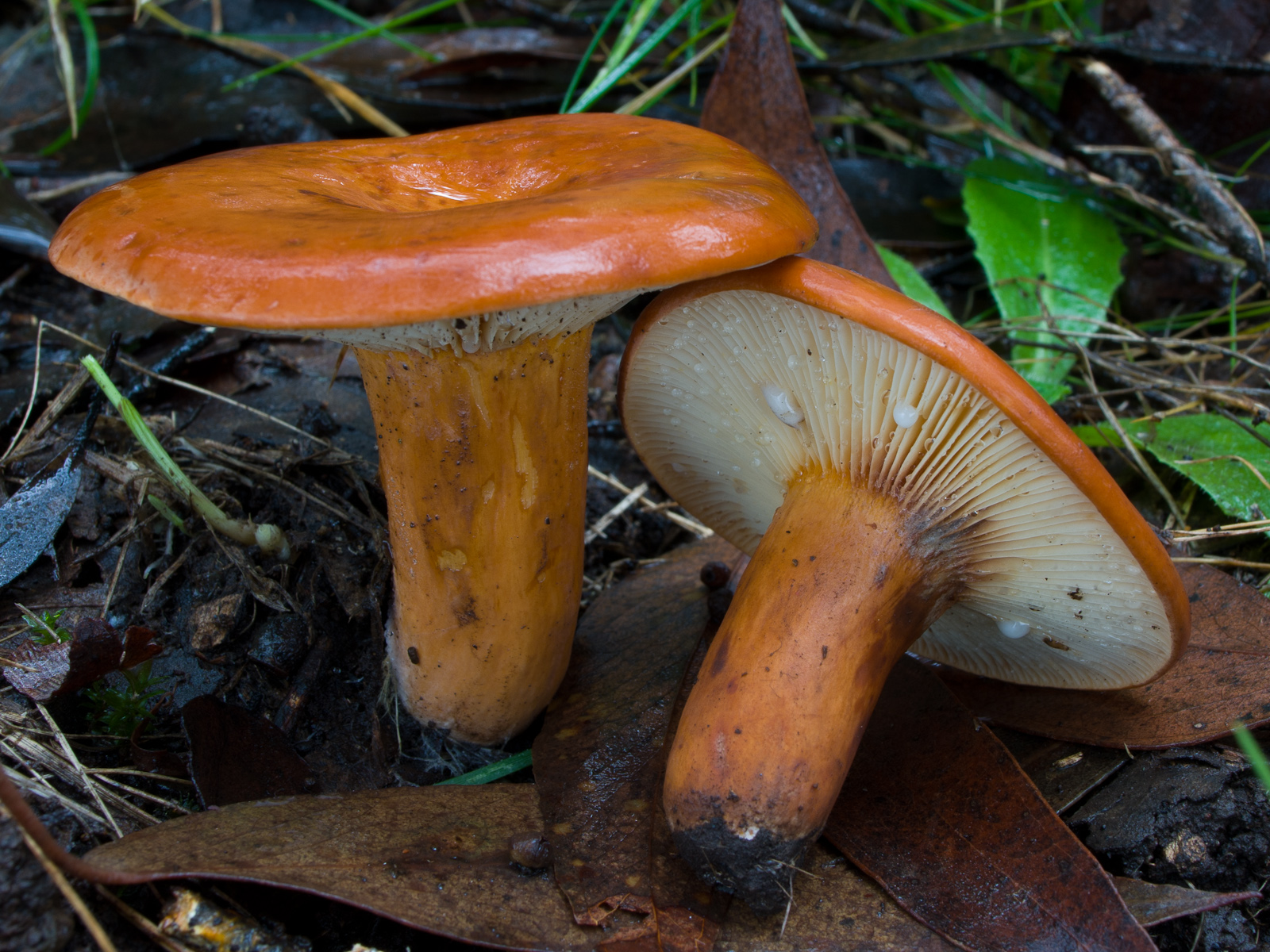

Scientific classification
- Kingdom: Fungi
- Division: Basidiomycota
- Class: Agaricomycetes
- Order: Russulales
- Family: Russulaceae
- Genus: Lactarius
- Species: L. eucalypti

Binomial name
- Lactarius eucalypti O.K.Mill. & R.N.Hilton (1987)

= Lactarius eucalypti =

Species of fungus

Lactarius eucalypti is a species of milk-cap fungus in the family Russulaceae. Found in Australia, it was described as new to science in 1987 by Orson K. Miller, Jr. and Roger N. Hilton. The mushroom grows on the ground in woodlands of jarrah (Eucalyptus marginata), karri (E. diversicolor) and marri (Corymbia calophylla). Fruiting only generally occurs during years of higher rainfall, the mushrooms appearing in May and June.

The orange-brown cap is convex and may become flat with age, and measures 1.8 to 3.1 cm across.
