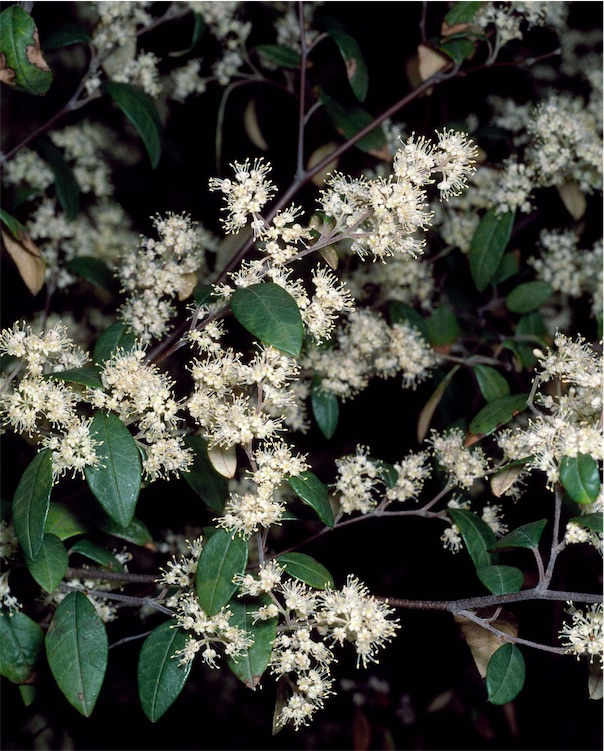
- Pomaderris ligustrina in the ANBG

Scientific classification
- Kingdom: Plantae
- Clade: Tracheophytes
- Clade: Angiosperms
- Clade: Eudicots
- Clade: Rosids
- Order: Rosales
- Family: Rhamnaceae
- Genus: Pomaderris
- Species: P. ligustrina

Binomial name
- Pomaderris ligustrina Sieber ex DC.

= Pomaderris ligustrina =

Privet pomaderris

Species of flowering plant

Pomaderris ligustrina, commonly known as privet pomaderris, is a species of flowering plant in the family Rhamnaceae and is endemic to south-eastern continental Australia. It is a shrub with hairy stems, lance-shaped to narrowly elliptic leaves, and loose clusters of cream-coloured or yellow flowers.

== Description ==
Pomaderris ligustrina is a shrub that typically grows to a height of 1.0–4.5 m (3 ft 3 in – 14 ft 9 in), its branchlets covered with both simple and rust-coloured, star-shaped hairs when young. The leaves are usually lance-shaped to narrowly elliptic, 20–80 mm (0.79–3.15 in) long and 10–20 mm (0.39–0.79 in) wide with stipules 5–7 mm (0.20–0.28 in) long at the base but that fall off as the leaf develops. The upper surface of the leaves is glabrous and the lower surface covered with silky, rust-coloured hairs. The flowers are creamy-white to yellow and arranged in loose panicles 10–50 mm (0.39–1.97 in) long, each flower on a pedicel 1.5–2.5 mm (0.059–0.098 in) long. The floral cup is 1.5–2.5 mm (0.059–0.098 in) long, the sepals 0.8–1.4 mm (0.031–0.055 in) long but fall off as the flowers open, and there are no petals. Flowering occurs in September and October.

== Taxonomy ==
Pomaderris ligustrina was first formally described in 1825 by Augustin Pyramus de Candolle in Prodromus Systematis Naturalis Regni Vegetabilis from an unpublished description by Franz Sieber. The specific epithet (ligustrina) means "privet-like".

In 1997, Neville Grant Walsh and Fiona Coates described subspecies latifolia in the journal Muelleria and the name, and that of the autonym are accepted by the Australian Plant Census:

- Pomaderris ligustrina subsp. latifolia N.G.Walsh & Coates has broadly egg-shaped to more or less circular leaves less than twice as long as wide, and sepals 1.5–2 mm (0.059–0.079 in) long;
- Pomaderris ligustrina Sieber ex DC. subsp. ligustrina N.G.Walsh & Coates has lance-shaped to narrowly elliptic leaves more than twice as long as wide, and sepals 0.8–1.4 mm (0.031–0.055 in) long.

== Distribution and habitat ==
Privet pomaderris grows in forest on the ranges and escarpments from south-east Queensland and New South Wales to as far west as Bairnsdale in Victoria. Subspecies latifolia is rare and only occurs in south-eastern Queensland and as far south as Guyra in northern New South Wales.
