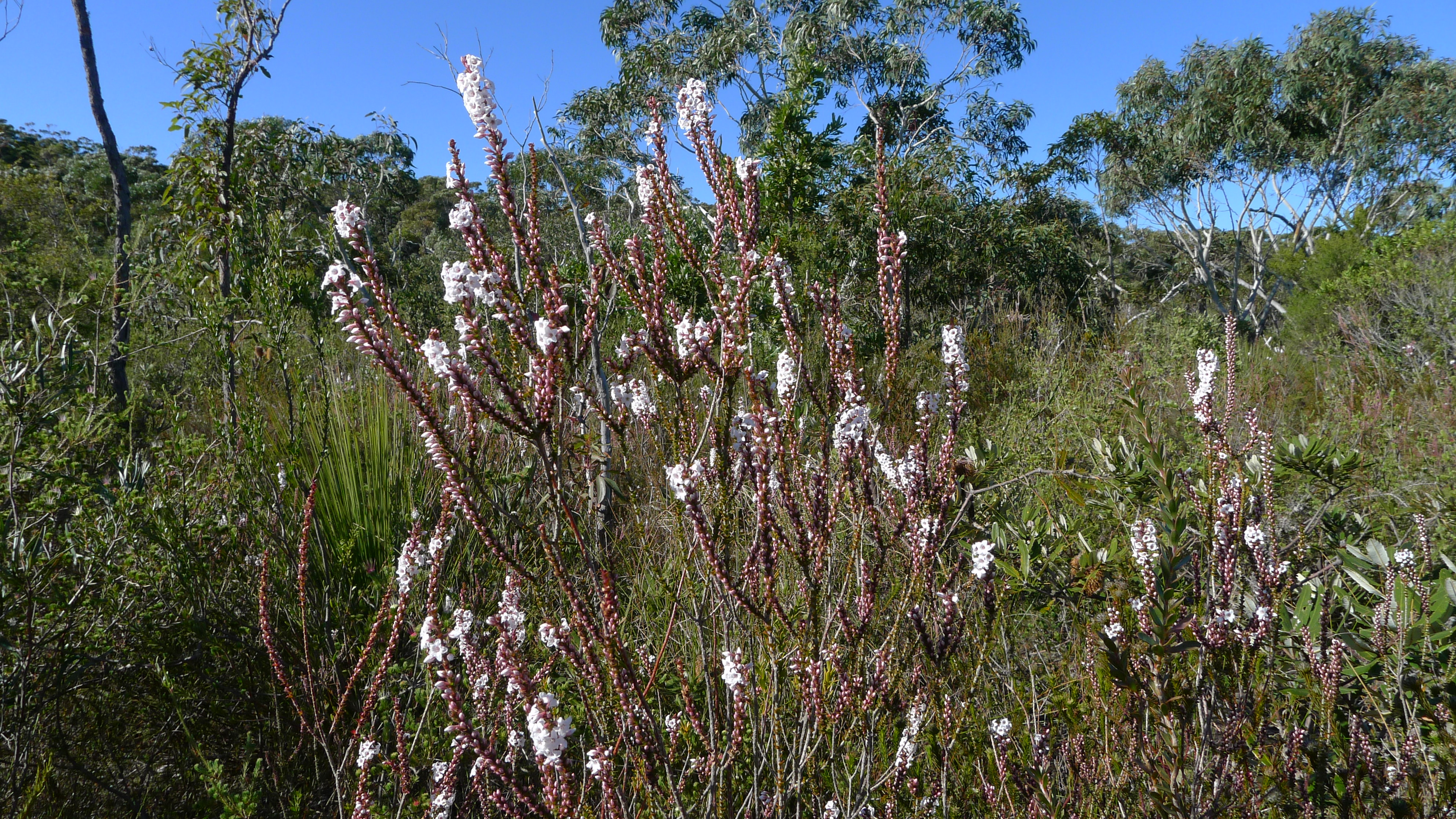
- Epacris microphylla growing in the Royal National Park.

Scientific classification
- Kingdom: Plantae
- Clade: Tracheophytes
- Clade: Angiosperms
- Clade: Eudicots
- Clade: Asterids
- Order: Ericales
- Family: Ericaceae
- Genus: Epacris
- Species: E. microphylla

Binomial name
- Epacris microphylla R.Br.

= Epacris microphylla =

Species of flowering plant

Epacris microphylla , commonly known as coral heath, is a plant in the heath family Ericaceae and which is endemic to eastern Australia. It is a common, wiry shrub with tiny leaves that are often obscured by the flowers, especially near the ends of the stems. The plant sometimes grows in dense groups, giving the effect of a snowfall.

== Description ==
Coral heath is an erect, wiry shrub with rod-like stems and angled branches, usually growing to a height of 1 metre (3 ft). The leaves are about 2.0–3.5 millimetres (0.08–0.1 in) long and wide, concave and egg-shaped to almost circular and sharply pointed but not prickly.

The flowers are arranged singly in the axils of as many as 90 of the upper leaves, often almost covering 40 centimetres (20 in) of the ends of the branches. The petals form a tube with spreading lobes 1.5–2.0 millimetres (0.06–0.08 in) long and are white with five red anthers visible in the centre. Flowers are present for most of the year, but the main flowering period is July to November.

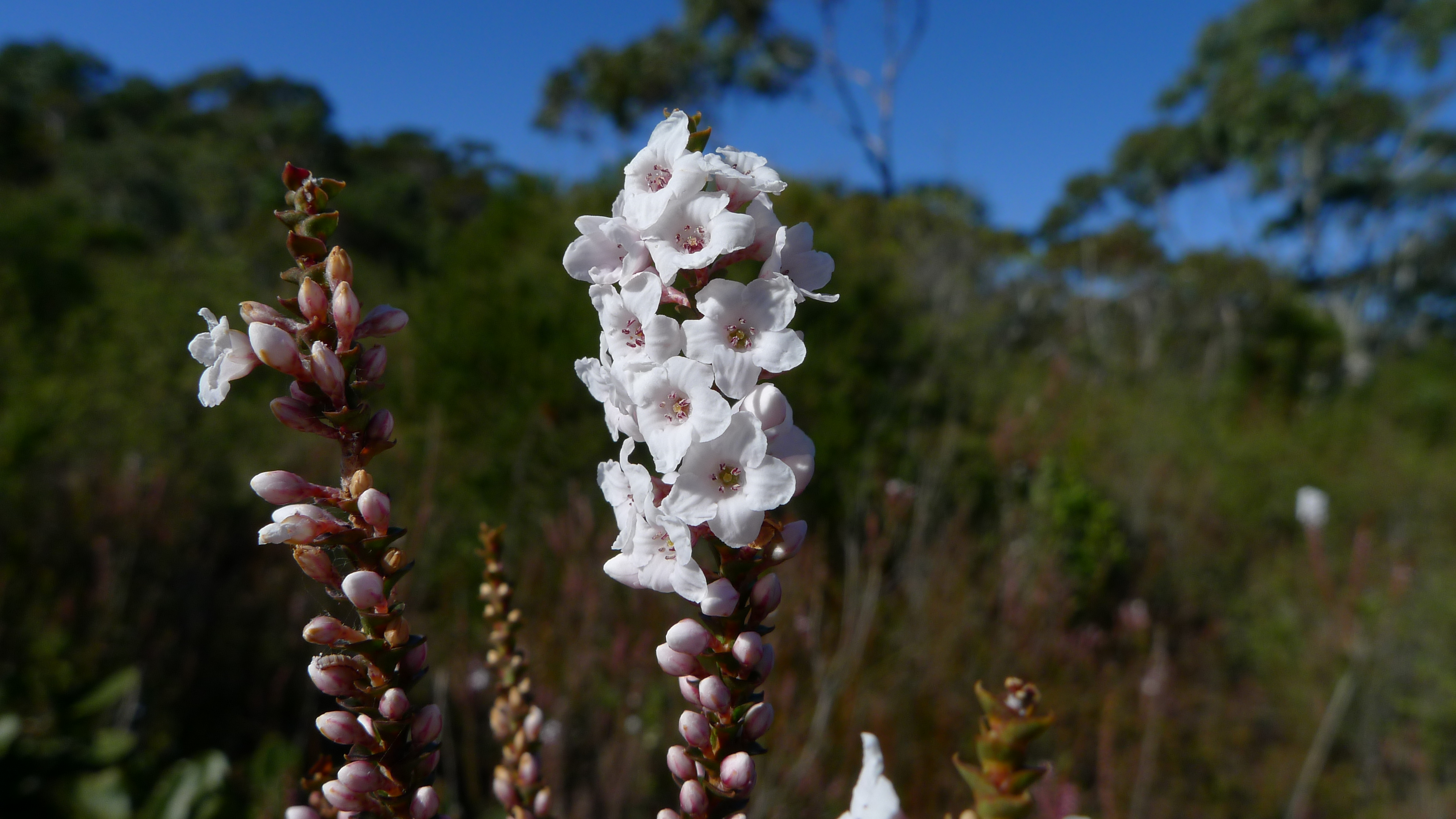
Epacris microphylla flowers

== Taxonomy and naming ==
Epacris microphylla was first formally described by Robert Brown in 1810 and the description was published in Prodromus Florae Novae Hollandiae. The specific epithet (microphylla) is derived from the Ancient Greek words mikros meaning "small" or "little" and phyllon meaning "leaf".

There are two varieties of E. microphylla:

- Epacris microphylla var. microphylla which is an open straggly shrub with few main stems and which flowers mainly from July to October;
- Epacris microphylla var. rhombifolia, or mountain coral heath, which is an erect shrub with several stems and which flowers from November to early March. It is classed as a distinct species (Epacris rhombifolia) in New South Wales and Victoria.

== Distribution and habitat ==
Coral heath grows in heathland in moist, rocky areas and in forest areas. It occurs in coastal areas in Queensland, New South Wales and Victoria, often in poor, sandy soils. It is also only known in a single locality in New Zealand, on the southern shore of the Manukau Harbour, near Auckland.

== Use in horticulture ==
Epacris microphylla is an attractive and hardy garden plant as long as it is grown in well-drained soil. It is difficult to propagate from seed but can be grown from semi-hard tip cuttings.
