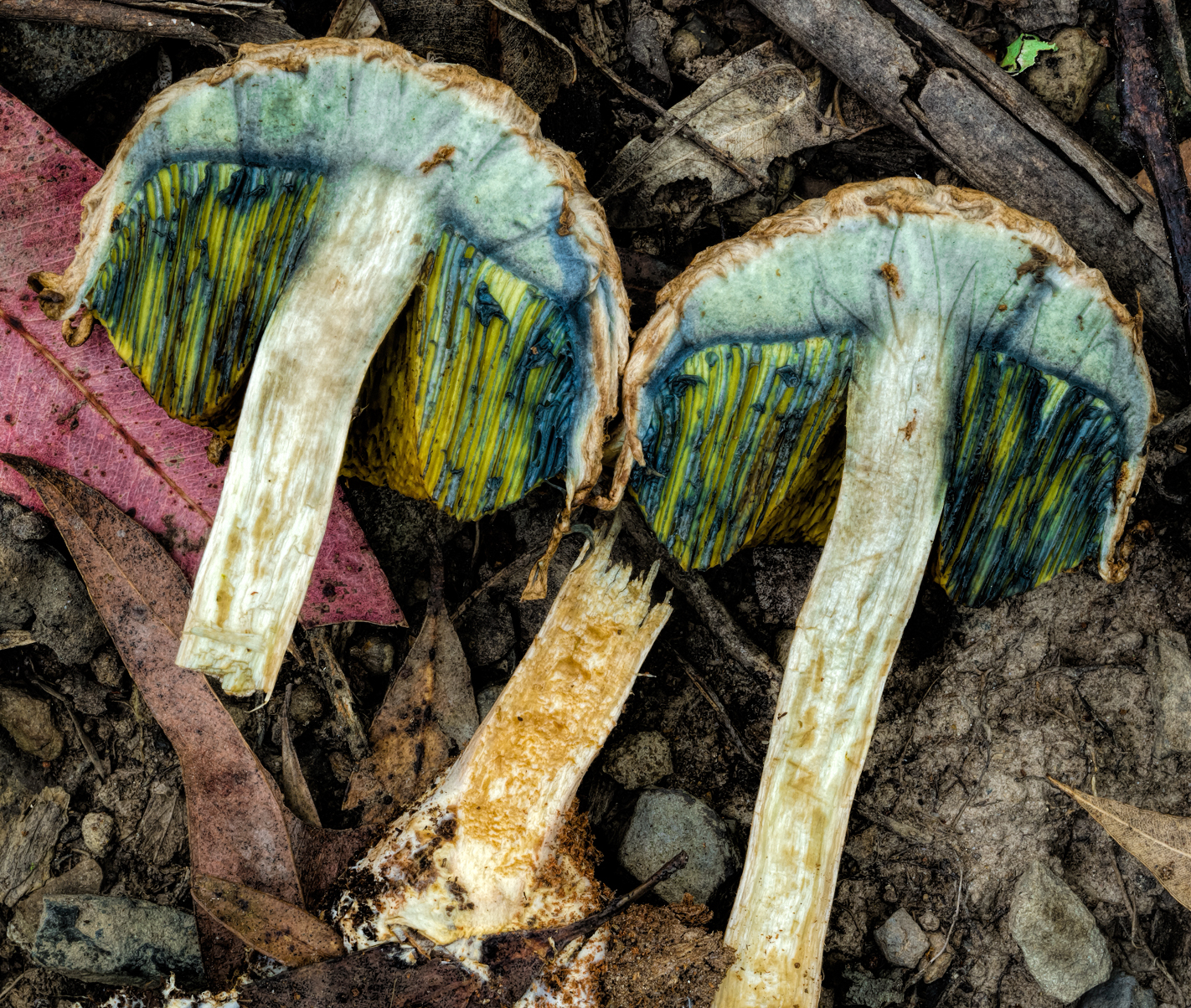

Scientific classification
- Domain: Eukaryota
- Kingdom: Fungi
- Division: Basidiomycota
- Class: Agaricomycetes
- Order: Boletales
- Family: Boletaceae
- Genus: Boletellus
- Species: B. dissiliens

Binomial name
- Boletellus dissiliens (Corner) Pegler & T.W.K.Young (1981)

Synonyms
- Boletus dissiliens Corner (1972)

= Boletellus dissiliens =

Species of fungus

Boletellus dissiliens is a species of fungus in the family Boletaceae. Found in Singapore, it was originally described as Boletus dissiliens by E.J.H. Corner in 1972, and transferred to Boletellus in 1981.
