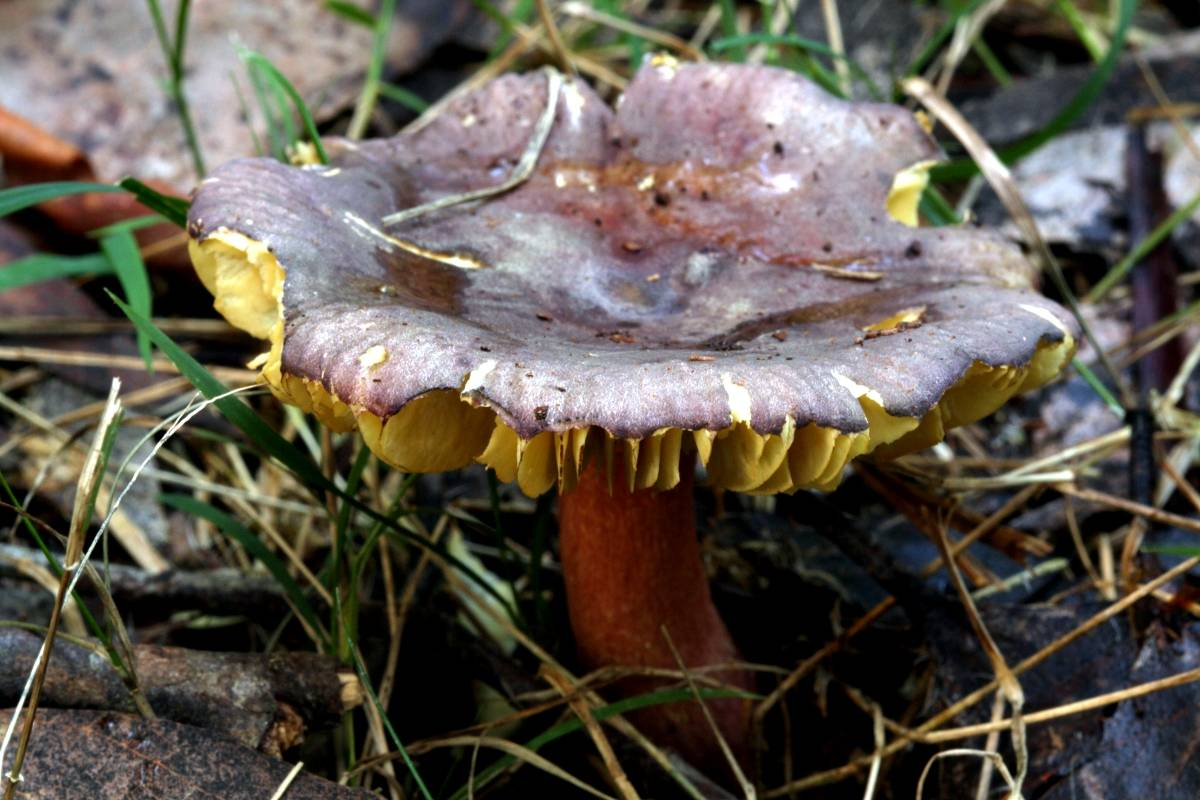

Scientific classification
- Domain: Eukaryota
- Kingdom: Fungi
- Division: Basidiomycota
- Class: Agaricomycetes
- Order: Russulales
- Family: Russulaceae
- Genus: Russula
- Species: R. clelandii

Binomial name
- Russula clelandii O.K.Mill. & R.N.Hilton (1987)

= Russula clelandii =

Species of fungus

Russula clelandii is a species of fungus in the family Russulaceae. Found in Australia, it was described as new to science in 1987. The fungus fruits on the ground in mixed woodlands of jarrah (Eucalyptus marginata) and karri (E. diversicolor), plants with which it is suspected of forming ectomycorrhizae. Fruitbodies are similar in morphology to the North American species Russula mariae. The specific epithet honours Australian naturalist John Burton Cleland.

== See also ==
- List of Russula species
