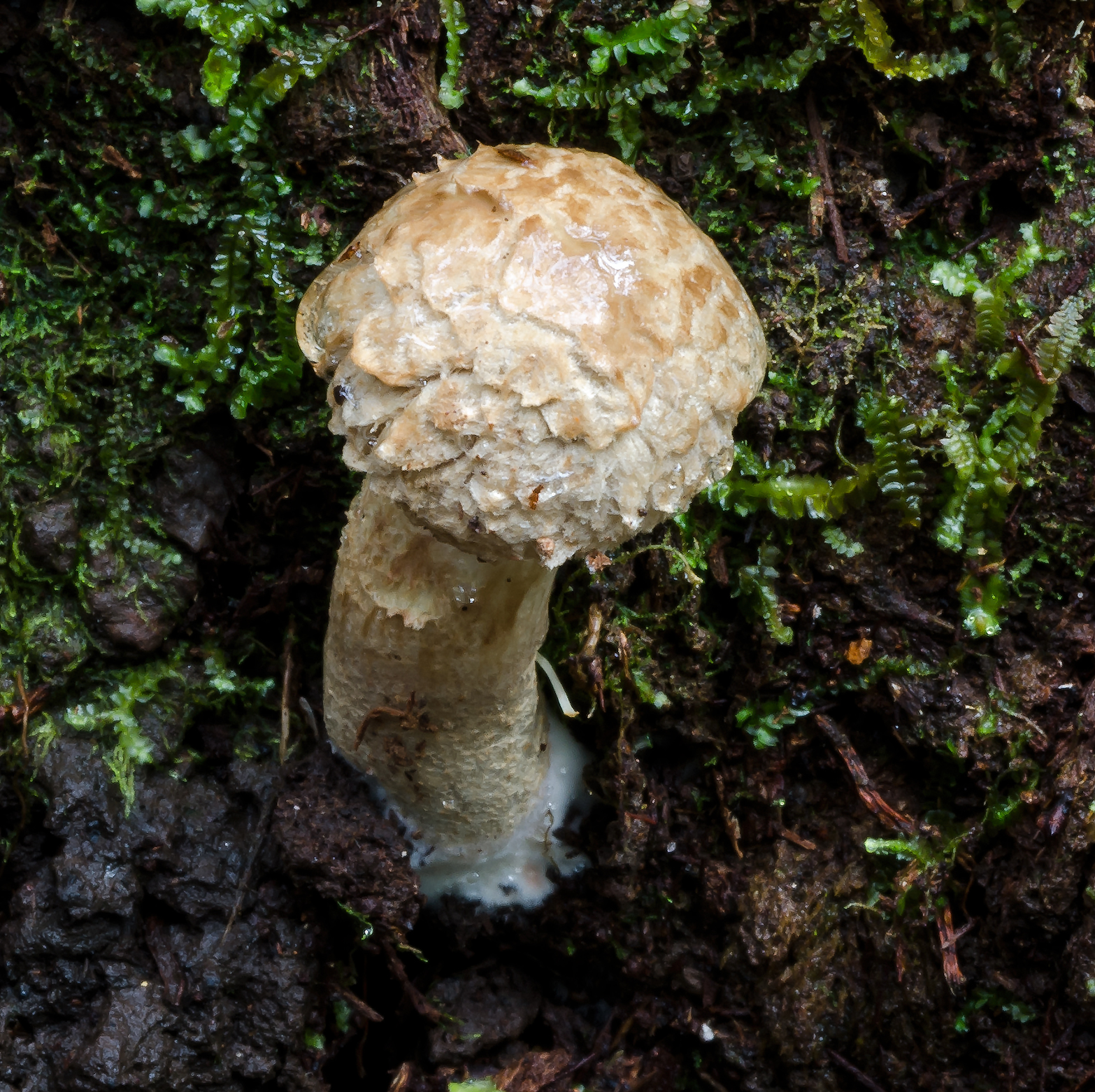

Scientific classification
- Domain: Eukaryota
- Kingdom: Fungi
- Division: Basidiomycota
- Class: Agaricomycetes
- Order: Boletales
- Family: Boletaceae
- Genus: Boletellus
- Species: B. ananiceps

Binomial name
- Boletellus ananiceps (Berk.) Singer (1955)

Synonyms
- Boletus ananaeceps Berk. (1873); Boletellus ananaeceps (Berk.) Singer; Strobilomyces ananaeceps (Berk.) Sacc. (1888)

= Boletellus ananiceps =

Species of fungus

Boletellus ananiceps (also spelled ananaeceps) is a species of fungus in the family Boletaceae. First described by Miles Joseph Berkeley under the name Boletus ananaeceps in 1873, it was transferred to Boletellus in 1955 by Rolf Singer. It is found in Australia.
