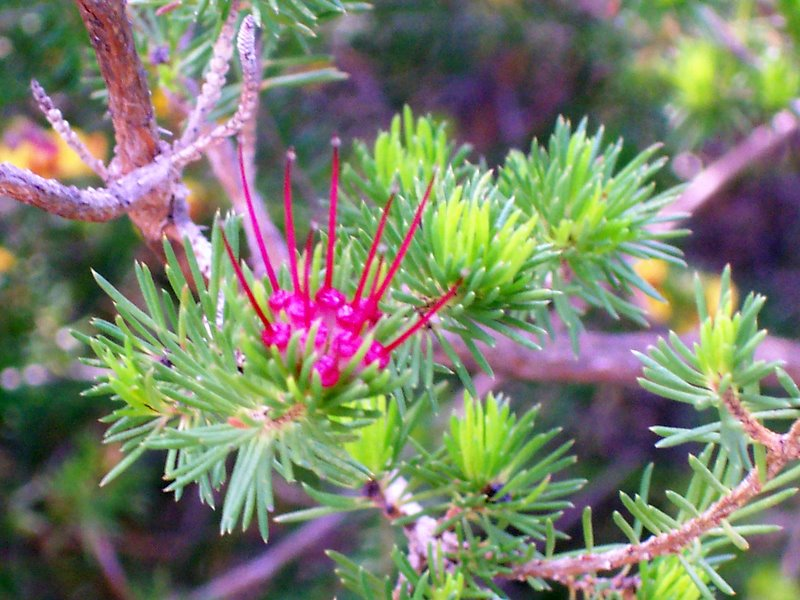
- In Ku-ring-gai Chase National Park

Scientific classification
- Kingdom: Plantae
- Clade: Tracheophytes
- Clade: Angiosperms
- Clade: Eudicots
- Clade: Rosids
- Order: Myrtales
- Family: Myrtaceae
- Genus: Darwinia
- Species: D. fascicularis

Binomial name
- Darwinia fascicularis Rudge
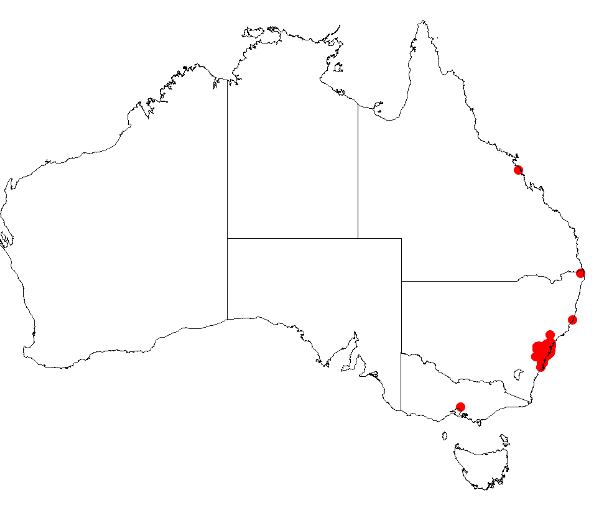
- Occurrence data from AVH

Synonyms
- Cryptostemon ericaeus F.Muell. & Miq.

= Darwinia fascicularis =

Species of flowering plant

Darwinia fascicularis is a species of flowering plant in the myrtle family, and is endemic to areas near Sydney. It is a small shrub with aromatic foliage and white flowers that turn red as they mature. Nectar feeding birds are attracted to the flowers.

== Description ==
Darwinia fascicularis is a pleasantly scented small plant up to 1.5–2.5 m (4.9–8.2 ft) tall. The light green needle-like leaves are small, smooth, almost cylindrical and 8–16 mm (0.31–0.63 in) long. The leaves are crowded, arranged opposite or whorled on spreading branches. The flowers are white on a peduncle 1 mm (0.039 in) long. The flowers resemble a pin-cushion appearing in clusters of 4-20 flowers at the end of branches turning red as they age. The prominent styles are straight or curved, 12–18 mm (0.47–0.71 in) long and either white or red. The bracts are leaf-like or triangular, dry, translucent and about 2–14 mm (0.079–0.55 in) long. The smaller bracts may be oblong or triangular shaped, 3–5 mm (0.12–0.20 in) long and falling off early. The tubular flowers are 5–7 mm (0.20–0.28 in) long and 1–1.5 mm (0.039–0.059 in) in diameter with rounded ribbing. The sepals are usually toothed and triangular and about half the length of the petals. Flowering occurs from June to September.

== Taxonomy and naming ==
Darwinia fascicularis was first formally described by Edward Rudge in 1816 and published in Transactions of the Linnean Society of London. The specific epithet (fascicularis) means "resembling a small bundle".

Two subspecies are recognised by the Australian Plant Census.

- Darwinia fascicularis subsp. oligantha was first formally described in 1962 by Barbara Briggs and published in Contributions from the New South Wales National Herbarium. This species usually has only 4 flowers, rarely 2 or 6 and only appearing in pairs. A small shrub growing to about 30 cm (12 in) high with branches often growing horizontally along the ground and upturned at the tip. The branches will take root when in contact with the soil. Leaves are less crowded and a darker green. It grows at higher altitudes in the Blue Mountains to Wentworth Falls in New South Wales in heath or on shallow sandstone soils. The epithet (oligantha) means "few-flowered", referring to the small number of flowers in each inflorescence.
- Darwinia fascicularis subsp. fascicularis (the autonym) is an erect shrub to 2 m (6.6 ft) high and has four to twenty flowers in a tight cluster. The branches do not take root when in contact with the soil. It grows from Gosford in the Central Coast to Bulli near Wollongong within 30 km (19 mi) of the coast. Grows in exposed situations on the edge of sandstone ridges, mostly in heathland or dry sclerophyll scrub below 500 m (1,600 ft).

== Distribution and habitat ==
Darwinia fascicularis grows from as far north as Gosford in the Central Coast to Bulli near Wollongong. The habitat is poor sandy soils, in dry eucalyptus forest or heathlands in high rainfall areas.

== Uses in horticulture ==
Darwinia fascicularis is a hardy species, for an open sunny situation in well-drained soil. Several native birds are attracted to this species of Darwinia as a source of nectar they include the New Holland honeyeater (Phylidonyris novaehollandiae), tawny-crowned honeyeater (Gliciphila melanops) and eastern spinebill (Acanthorhynchus tenuirostris). This genus is believed to be predominantly pollinated by birds.
