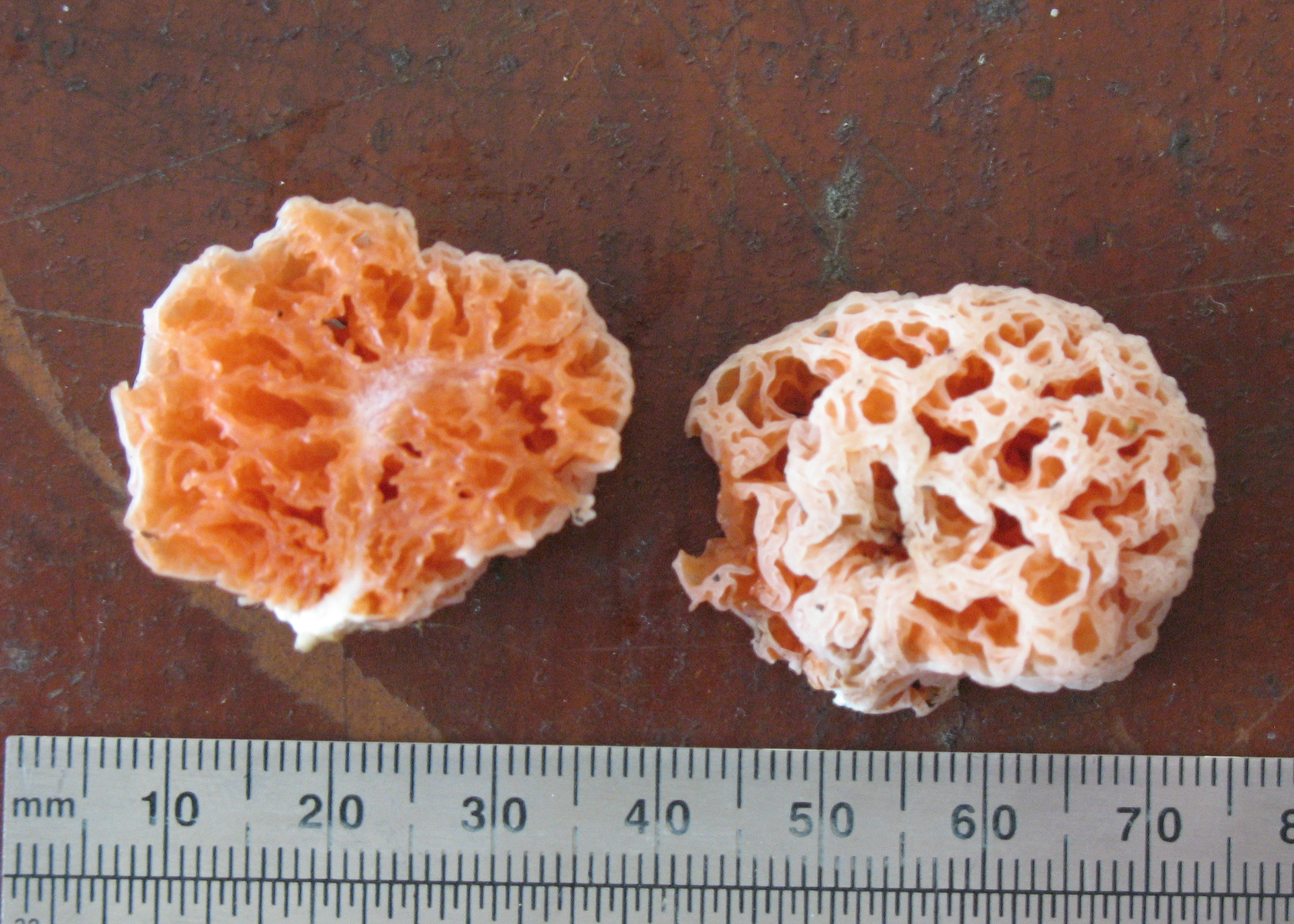
- S. squarepantsii

Scientific classification
- Kingdom: Fungi
- Division: Basidiomycota
- Class: Agaricomycetes
- Order: Boletales
- Family: Boletaceae
- Subfamily: Leccinoideae
- Genus: Spongiforma; Desjardin, Manf. Binder, Roekring & Flegel (2009)

Type species
- Spongiforma thailandica Desjardin, Manf. Binder, Roekring & Flegel (2009)

Species
- S. squarepantsii S. thailandica

= Spongiforma =

Genus of fungi

Spongiforma is a genus of sponge-like fungi in the family Boletaceae. Newly described in 2009, the genus contains two species: S. thailandica and S. squarepantsii. The type species S. thailandica is known only from Khao Yai National Park in central Thailand, where it grows in soil in old-growth forests dominated by dipterocarp trees. The rubbery fruit bodies, which has a strong odour of coal-tar similar to Tricholoma sulphureum, consists of numerous internal cavities lined with spore-producing tissue. S. squarepantsii, described as new to science in 2011, is found in Malaysia. It produces sponge-like, rubbery orange fruit bodies with a fruity or musky odour. These fruit bodies will—like a sponge—resume their original shape if water is squeezed out. The origin of the specific name derives from its perceived resemblance to the cartoon character SpongeBob SquarePants. Apart from differences in distribution, S. squarepantsii differs from S. thailandica in its colour, odour, and spore structure.

== Description ==
The fruit bodies of Spongiforma species have a brain-like to sponge-like form, and grow on the surface of the ground. They do not have a stalk, and lack a layer of outer skin. The small cavities (locules) of the fruit body are irregular in outline and measure between 2 and 20 mm (0.08 and 0.8 in) in diameter. They are lined with a smooth, greyish-orange to brown or reddish brown hymenium (spore-bearing tissue), with sterile ridges that range in colour from white to cream. The columella (a column-like structure extending up into the fruit body) is poorly developed, pear-shaped, cream-coloured, and attached at the base to white rhizomorphs. The basidiospores are brown to vinaceous-brown in mass, almond-shaped, bilaterally symmetrical, and finely wrinkled. Spores bear a central apiculus (a region that was once attached to the sterigmata at the end of a basidium) and a small apical pore. The spores are reddish-brown in water, violet grey in 3% potassium hydroxide, inamyloid, and cyanophilic (turning red in the stain acetocarmine). The basidia are four-spored, and do not discharge the spores forcibly. Cystidia are common on the sterile locule edges; they are hyaline (translucent) and range in shape from cylindrical to ventricose (swollen in the middle) or rostrate (with a beaklike proboscis). The hyphae of the flesh are gelatinous and inamyloid. Clamp connections are absent from the hyphae.

== Taxonomy and naming ==
The type species S. thailandica was first described scientifically in 2009 by Egon Horak, Timothy Flegel and Dennis E. Desjardin, based on specimens collected in July 2002 in Khao Yai National Park, central Thailand, and roughly three years later in the same location. Before this, S. thailandica had been reported and illustrated in a 2001 Thai publication as an unidentified species of Hymenogaster.

S. squarepantsii was first described scientifically in 2011 in the journal Mycologia, authored by a team headed by Desjardin with Kabir Peay, and Thomas Bruns. The description was based on two specimens collected by Bruns in 2010 in Lambir Hills National Park, in Sarawak, Malaysia. The species was first mentioned in the scientific literature in 2010 in a study of the ectomycorrhizal mushrooms in a tropical dipterocarp rainforest in Lambir Hills, although it was not formally described in this publication.

The genus name Spongiforma refers to the sponge-like nature of the fruit body. The specific epithet thailandica denotes the country in which the type species is found; the epithet squarepantsii honors the well-known cartoon character SpongeBob SquarePants. The unusual epithet garnered the species attention in the popular press.

== Phylogeny and classification ==
- Tylopilus tabacinus
- - Tylopilus rhoadsiae
  - - Boletus violaceofuscus
    - - Boletus separans
      - Boletus gertrudiae
- - - Strobilomyces sp.
    - - Strobilomyces floccopus
      - Strobilomyces sp.
  - - - Spongiforma thailandica
      - Spongiforma squarepantsii
    - - Porphyrellus sordidus
      - - Porphyrellus porphyrosporus
        - Porphyrellus pseudoscaber

Phylogeny and relationships of Spongiforma and other Boletaceae species based on ribosomal DNA sequences.

Molecular analysis of the DNA sequences of the internal transcribed spacer (IT) region of S. thailandica showed that the species was part of the Boletineae, one of several lineages of Boletales recognized taxonomically at the level of suborder. The similarity between S. thailandica and S. squarepantsii was confirmed with molecular analysis, which showed a 98% match between large subunit ribosomal DNA sequences of the two—a value typical of many species in the same genus of Boletaceae. Spongiforma is sister (sharing a common ancestor) to the genus Porphyrellus; Spongiforma and Porphyrellus form a clade that is sister to Strobilomyces. All three genera are members of the family Boletaceae.

The phylogenetic relationships determined by molecular techniques are not consistent with a classification scheme based on similarities in spore morphology. Several bolete taxa have been proposed to accommodate species with reddish-brown to vinaceous-brown, finely wrinkled (rugulose) to perforated or punctate spores; these include Boletus subgenus Tylopilus, Tylopilus subgenus Porphyrellus, Austroboletus, or Porphyrellus. Austroboletus tristis and A. longipes, two species from Southeast Asia, share several spore characteristics with Spongiforma thailandica. All three species have spores with rugulose surfaces, sometimes with minute punctures, and the spores turn purple in potassium hydroxide. Additionally, the pores from the three species share similar surface ornamentation visible with scanning electron microscopy. In contrast to Spongiforma, however, Austroboletus spores do not have an apical pore. Genetic analysis shows that Spongiforma is more closely allied with the smooth-spored Porphyrellus than with the rugulose-punctate-spored Austroboletus.

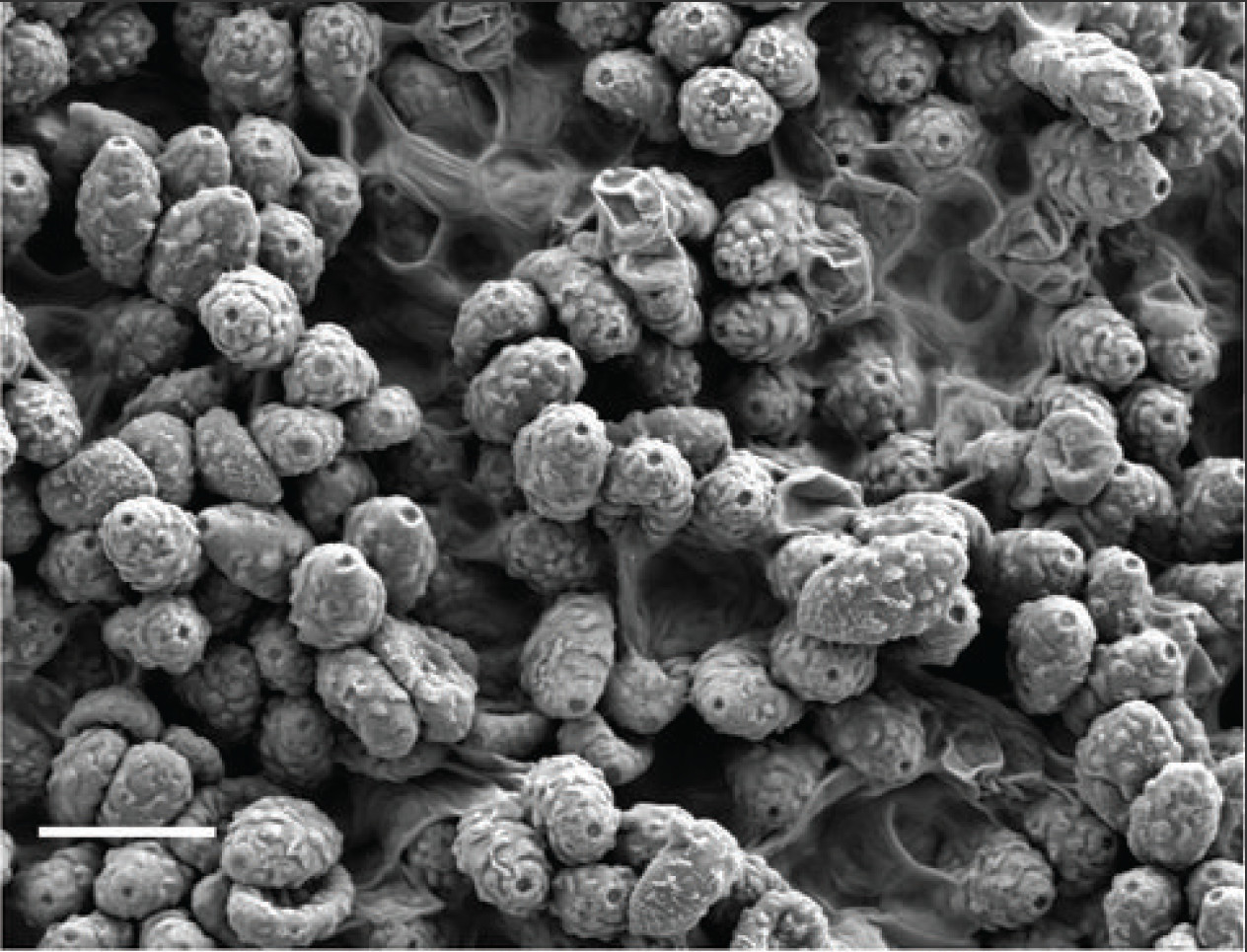
Spores of S. squarepantsii; scale bar = 10 μm

Relatively few boletes have an apical pore at the distal end of their basidiospores. The dark reddish-brown, smooth spores of Porphyrellus amylosporus are truncate with a thin-walled depression. Some species of Heimioporus have spores with apical pores, but molecular analyses demonstrate that Heimioporus is only distantly related to Spongiforma.

Spongiforma further resembles Austroboletus and Porphyrellus species in the cellular structure of the cap cuticle (pileipellis). The arrangement, known as a trichodermium, features the outermost hyphae emerging roughly parallel, like hairs, perpendicular to the surface of the fruit body. The trichodermium comprises chains of short, cylindrical to somewhat moniliform cells (resembling a string of beads) with terminal (end) cells that are cylindrical to club-shaped. This cellular arrangement is similar to that present in the sterile edges of the tissues that demarcate the locules in Spongiforma. According to Desjardins and colleagues, this may represent vestiges of what was once cap cuticle or peridial tissue in an ancestor. Spongiforma is the only genus of the Boletales that forms above-ground fruit bodies that lack a peridium and have many exposed locules lined with basidia that do not forcibly discharge spores.

== Ecology, habitat and distribution ==
Both species of Spongiforma are known only from their original collection locations. S. thailandica was found growing on the ground in an old growth forest in Khao Yai National Park (Nakhon Nayok Province, Thailand), at an elevation of about 750 metres (2,460 ft). The fungus is thought to grow in a mycorrhizal association with Shorea henryana and Dipterocarpus gracilis, species considered to be endangered and critically endangered, respectively, by the International Union for Conservation of Nature. Spongiforma squarepantsii was collected from the ground where it was growing solitarily under undetermined dipterocarp trees in Lambir Hills National Park (Sarawak State, Malaysia), northern Borneo. This tropical rainforest receives about 3,000 mm (120 in) of rain yearly, with average temperatures ranging from 24 to 32 °C (75 to 90 °F). Spongiforma species have lost the ability to eject their spores forcefully, and have distinctive odours, suggesting that the fungus relies on the activity of animals to help disperse spores. Because the island habitat of the genus restricts gene flow and because the two known species are separated by considerable distance geographically, the authors suggest that other unexplored, isolated tracts of dipterocarp forests between Thailand and Malaysia may contain additional species.
