= Spongiforma thailandica =

Scientific classification
- Kingdom: Fungi
- Division: Basidiomycota
- Class: Agaricomycetes
- Order: Boletales
- Family: Boletaceae
- Genus: Spongiforma
- Species: S. thailandica

Binomial name
- Spongiforma thailandica Desjardin, Manf. Binder, Roekring & Flegel
- Map of Thailand highlighting Nakhon Nayok Province, location of Khao Yai National Park where the species is found

Species of fungus

Spongiforma thailandica is a species of fungus in the family Boletaceae, genus Spongiforma. The stemless sponge-like species, first described in 2009, was found in Khao Yai National Park in central Thailand, where it grows in soil in old-growth forests. The rubbery fruit body, which has a strong odor of coal-tar similar to Tricholoma sulphureum, consists of numerous internal cavities lined with spore-producing tissue. Phylogenetic analysis suggests the species is closely related to the Boletaceae genera Porphyrellus and Strobilomyces.

== Taxonomy and phylogeny ==
- - - Porphyrellus porphyrosporus
    - - Porphyrellus pseudoscaber
      - Porphyrellus sordidus
  - Spongiforma thailandica
- Various Strobilomyces spp.

Phylogeny and relationships of Spongiforma and other Boletaceae species based on ribosomal DNA sequences.

The species was first described scientifically in 2009 by E. Horak, T. Flegel and D.E. Desjardin, based on specimens collected in July 2002 in Khao Yai National Park, central Thailand, and roughly three years later in the same location. Prior to this, the species had been mentioned in a 2001 Thai publication as an unidentified species of Hymenogaster. Phylogenetic analysis of ribosomal DNA sequences shows that Spongiforma is sister (sharing a common ancestor) to the genus Porphyrellus. The next most closely related genus is Strobilomyces. All three genera are members of the family Boletaceae, and in the Boletineae, one of several lineages of Boletales recognized taxonomically at the level of suborder.

The genus name Spongiforma refers to the sponge-like nature of the fruit body, while the specific epithet thailandica denotes the country in which the species is found.

== Description ==
The fruit body of Spongiforma thailandica is relatively large, up to 10 cm (3.9 in) in diameter by 4 to 7 cm (1.6 to 2.8 in) tall, and pale brownish gray to brown or reddish brown. It is sponge-like and rubbery—if water is squeezed out it will assume its original shape. The surface has irregular, relatively large cavities (locules), 2–20 mm (0.08–0.8 in) in diameter, lined with fertile (spore-producing) tissue. The mushrooms do not have a stem, but rather a columella—a small internal structure at the base of the fruit body, resembling a column, extending up into the fruit body. The columella has dimensions of 10–15 mm tall by 8–10 mm diameter (at the apex) by 3–4 mm (at the base), and it is attached to copious, fine white rhizomorphs. Fruit bodies have a strong odor of coal tar or burnt rubber (likened to Tricholoma sulphureum). The mushroom tissue turns purple when a drop of 3–10% potassium hydroxide is applied.

In mass, the spores appear to be brown to reddish-brown in color. Viewed with a microscope, they are amygdaliform (almond-shaped), and typically measure 10–11.5 by 5.5–7 μm. The basidia (spore-bearing cells) are cylindrical to roughly club-shaped, four-spored, with dimensions of 25–32 by 6.5–9.5 μm. They have straight sterigmata (slender extensions that attach to the spores) up to 9.5 μm long. The cystidia (large, sterile cells in the hymenium) are cylindrical to roughly club-shaped, thin-walled, and measure 25–48 by 5–10 μm. They are inamyloid, meaning they will not absorb iodine when stained with Melzer's reagent. The cystidia are plentiful on the edges of the locules, and occasional among the basidia. The hymenophore is made of interwoven branched hyphae that are arranged in a roughly parallel fashion. These thin-walled cylindrical hyphae have inflated septa (intracellular partitions), and are gelatinous, hyaline (translucent) and inamyloid. The subhymenium (the tissue layer immediately under the hymenium) is made of inflated hyphae that are hyaline, inamyloid, thin-walled, and non-gelatinous, measuring 9–20 by 9–14 μm.

The fruit bodies vaguely resemble those of the species Gymnopaxillus nudus, found in Australia growing in association with Eucalyptus. However, Gymnopaxillus fruit bodies grow underground, lack a strong odor, do not stain purple with potassium hydroxide, and have longer spores, typically 11–16 μm.

== Habitat and distribution ==
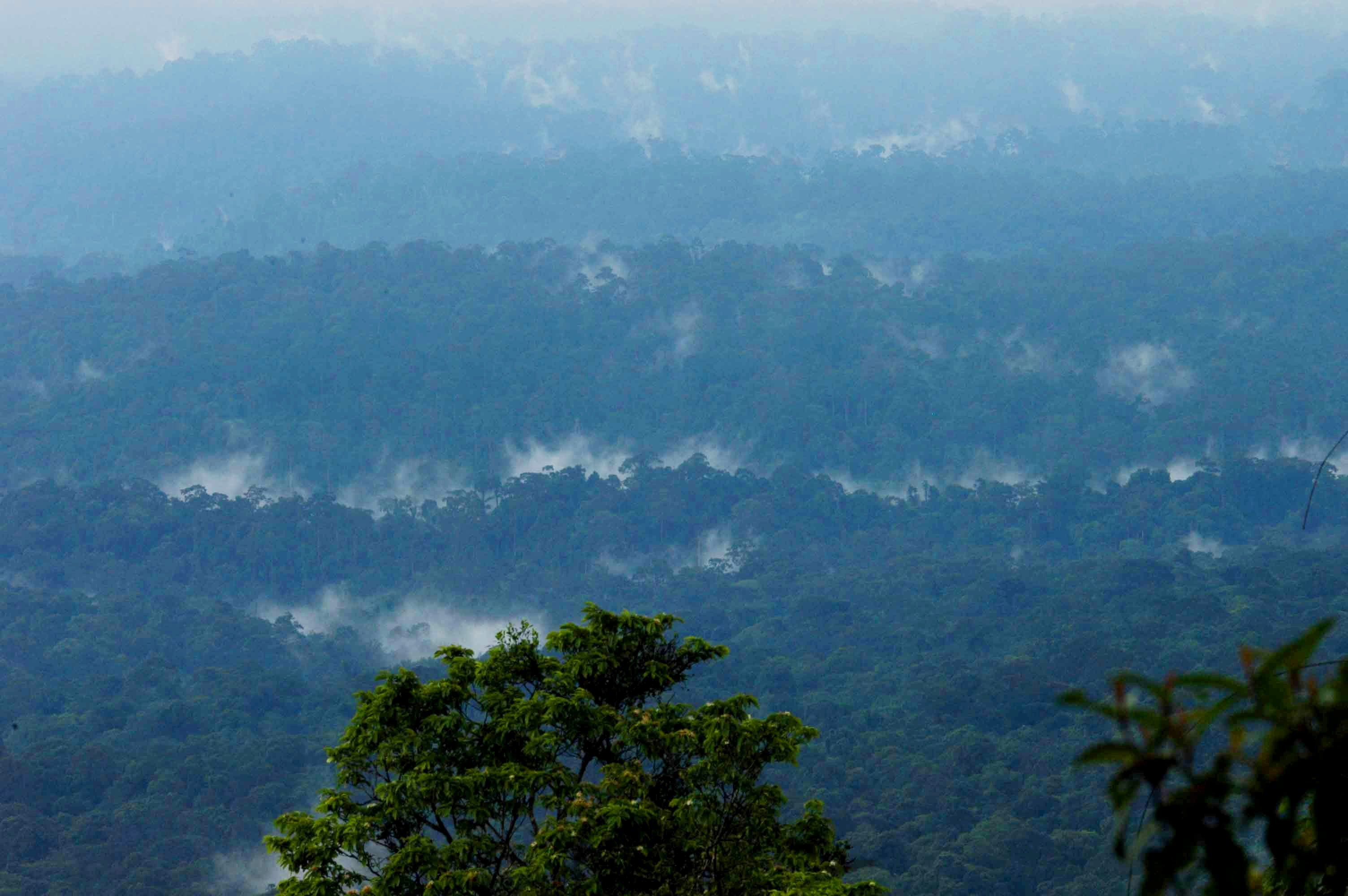
Khao Yai forests of central Thailand

Spongiforma thailandica was found growing on the ground in an old growth forest in Khao Yai National Park (Nakhon Nayok Province, Thailand), at an elevation of about 750 meters (2,460 ft). The fungus is thought to grow in a mycorrhizal association with Shorea henryana and Dipterocarpus gracilis.
