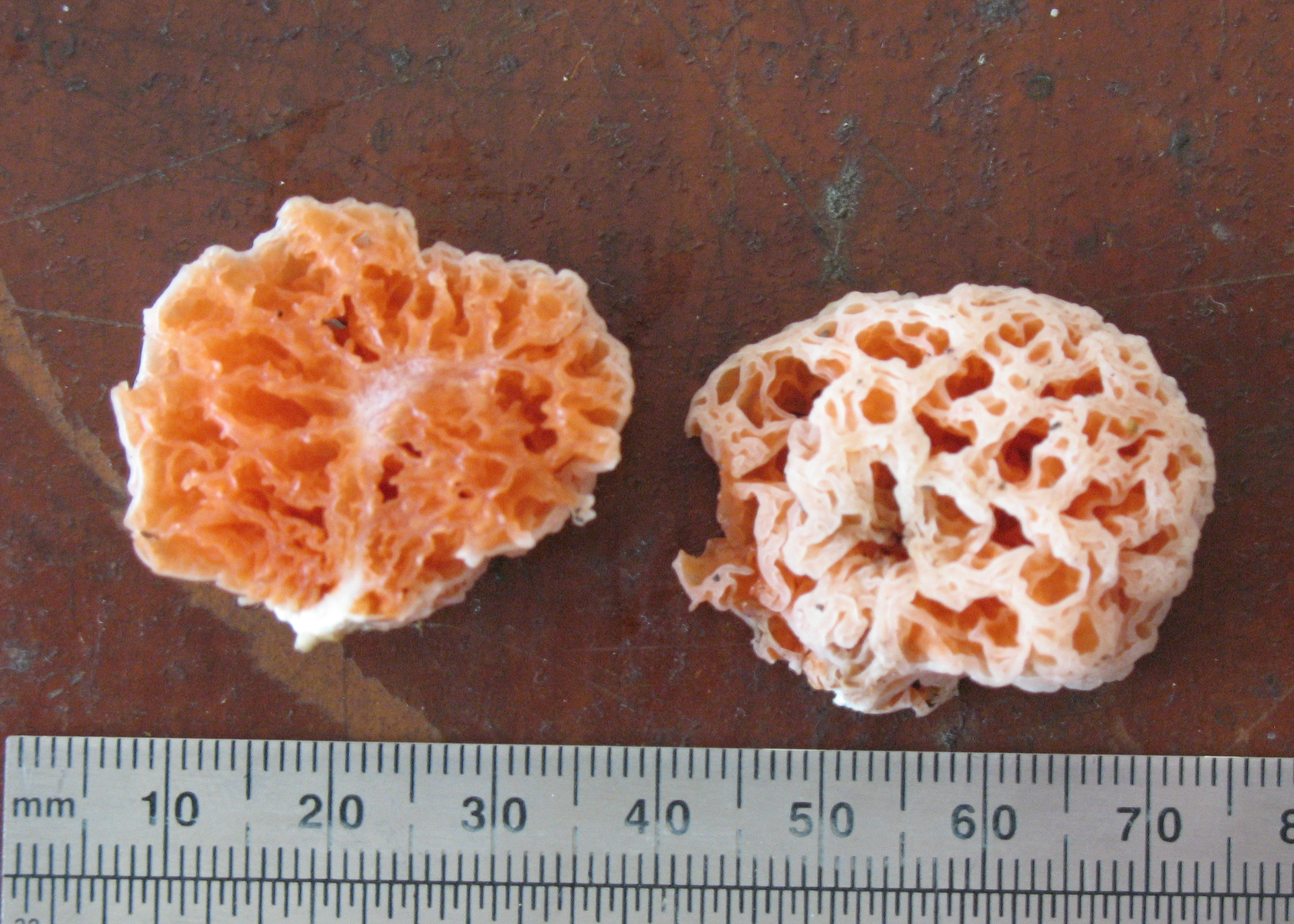
- Two halves of the orangish sponge-like fungus, with a ruler shown at the bottom for scale.

Conservation status
- Endangered (IUCN 3.1)

Scientific classification
- Kingdom: Fungi
- Division: Basidiomycota
- Class: Agaricomycetes
- Order: Boletales
- Family: Boletaceae
- Genus: Spongiforma
- Species: S. squarepantsii

Binomial name
- Spongiforma squarepantsii Desjardin, Peay & T.D.Bruns (2011)

= Spongiforma squarepantsii =

Species of fungus

Spongiforma squarepantsii is a species of fungus in the family Boletaceae, genus Spongiforma. Found in Malaysia, it was described as new to science in 2011. It produces sponge-like, rubbery orange fruit bodies that have a fruity or musky odour. The fruit bodies reach dimensions of 10 cm (3.9 in) wide by 7 cm (2.8 in) tall. Like a sponge, they will resume their original shape if water is squeezed out. The spores, produced on the surfaces of the hollows of the sponge, are almond-shaped with rough surfaces, and measure 10‑12.5 μm by 6‑7 μm. The name of the fungus is derived from the television series SpongeBob SquarePants, specifically its titular character. S. squarepantsii is one of two species in Spongiforma; it differs from S. thailandica in its color, odor, and spore structure.

== Taxonomy and classification ==
=== History ===
The species was first described scientifically online in May 2011 in the journal Mycologia, authored by American mycologists Dennis E. Desjardin, Kabir Peay, and Thomas Bruns. The description was based on two specimens collected by Bruns in 2010 in Lambir Hills National Park, in Sarawak, Malaysia. The species had first appeared in the literature in 2010 in a study of the ectomycorrhizal mushrooms in a tropical dipterocarp rainforest in Lambir Hills, although it was not formally described in this publication. Due to its unusual form, Desjardin and colleagues were initially uncertain whether the new species was a member of the Basidiomycota or the Ascomycota. Further analysis showed that the species was aligned with Spongiforma, a genus that was newly described from dipterocarp forests of Thailand in 2009. The similarity between the species collected in Borneo and Spongiforma thailandica was confirmed with molecular analysis, which showed a 98% match between ribosomal DNA sequences of the two.

The genus name Spongiforma refers to the sponge-like nature of the fruit body, while the specific epithet squarepantsii is a Latinisation of the well-known Nickelodeon cartoon character SpongeBob SquarePants, whose shape was purported to share a resemblance to the fungus. Additionally, the authors note that the spore-bearing surface (the hymenium), when viewed with scanning electron microscopy, somewhat resembles a "seafloor covered with tube sponges, reminiscent of the fictitious home of SpongeBob". Although the epithet was originally rejected by the editors of Mycologia as "frivolous", Desjardin and colleagues insisted that "we could name it whatever we liked".

== Description ==
The fruit body of Spongiforma squarepantsii is bright orange coloured, roughly spherical to oval, and measures 3–5 cm (1.2–2.0 in) wide by 2–3 cm (0.8–1.2 in) tall. Although it lacks a stipe, it has a rudimentary columella—a small cord of sterile tissue that extends to the center of the fruit body. The surface of the fruit body has deep ridges and folds somewhat resembling a brain. It is sponge-like and rubbery—if water is squeezed out, it will resume its original shape. The surface has irregular, relatively large cavities (locules), lined with fertile (spore-producing) tissue. The locules are between 2 and 10 mm (0.1 and 0.4 in) in diameter. The ridges of the locules are pale orange or lighter and ciliate (having hairlike projections). Fruit bodies have a strong odour described as "vaguely fruity or strongly musty". The mushroom tissue turns purple when a drop of 3% potassium hydroxide (KOH) is applied. In mass, the spores are a reddish-brown or deep mahogany colour. The edibility of the fruit body is unknown.

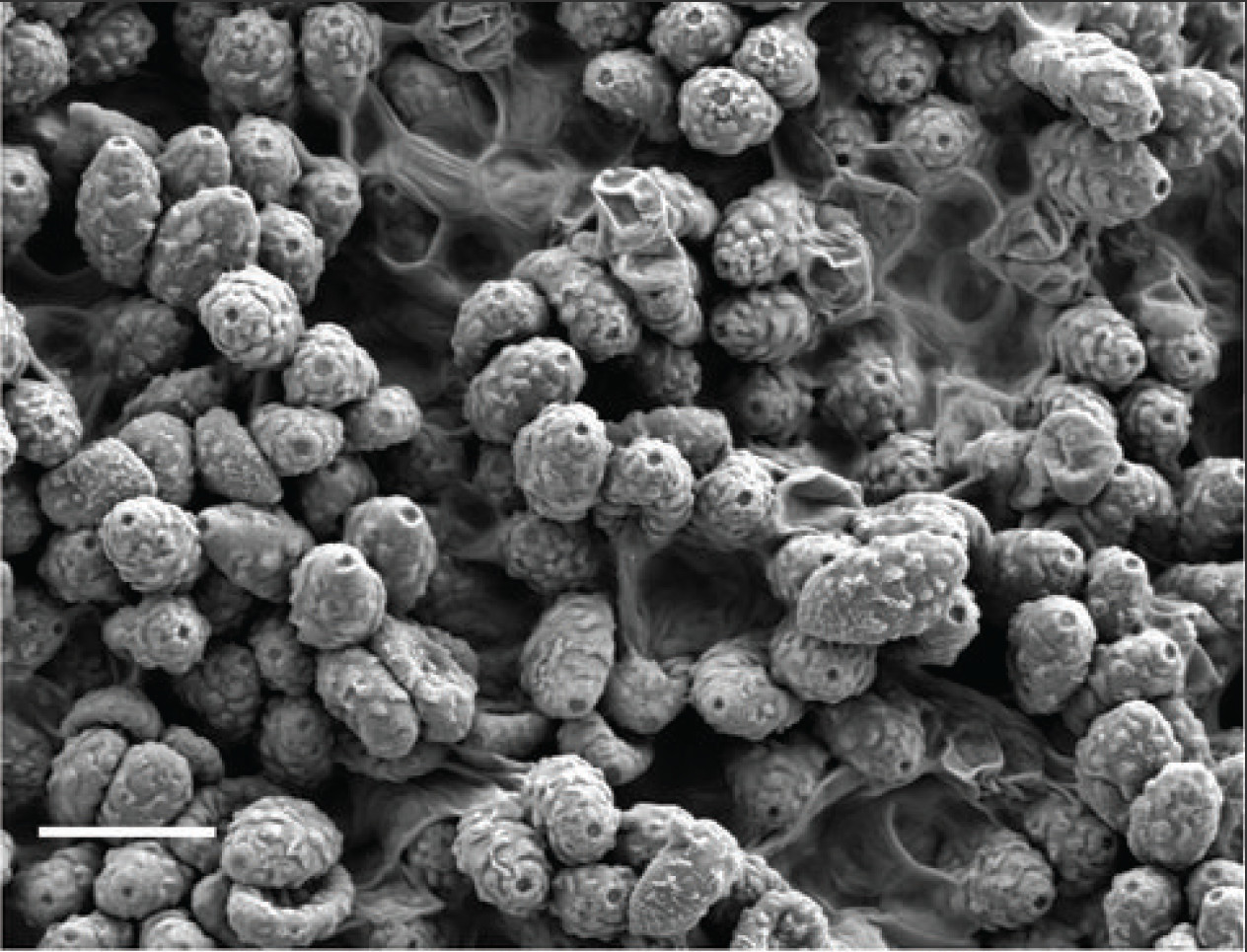
Scanning electron micrograph of the hymenium showing the warty spores with the prominent germ pore. Scale bar = 10 μm

The almond-shaped spores are typically 10–12.5 μm by 6–7 μm with thick walls measuring between 0.5–1.2 μm. They have a small central apiculus (a depressed area when the spore was once attached to the basidium via the sterigma). When mounted in distilled water, they have a coarsely warty surface and appear rusty brown in colour. When mounted in a 3% KOH solution, the spores are pale lilac grey, and the surface ornamentation forms swollen pustules that loosen and dissolve. Spores are dextrinoid (meaning they turn reddish-brown when stained with Melzer's reagent) and cyanophilic (red in acetocarmine). The basidia are club-shaped, and four-spored with sterigmata up to 9.5 μm long. The ridges of the locules comprise erect cystidia mixed with chains of erect cylindrical hyphae measuring 4–6 μm in diameter. The cystidia are roughly cylindrical, and have dimensions of 20–60 μm by 4–9 μm. There are no clamp connections present in the hyphae of the fungus.

=== Similar species ===
The related species Spongiforma thailandica, newly described in 2009, differs from S. squarepantsii in several ways: it has larger fruit bodies, 5–10 cm (2.0–3.9 in) wide by 4–7 cm (1.6–2.8 in) tall; its gleba is initially pale greyish-orange to brownish-grey before darkening to reddish-brown or dark brown; and it smells of coal tar. Microscopically, S. thailandica has spores with less prominent surface warts.

== Habitat and distribution ==
Spongiforma squarepantsii was found growing on the ground in Lambir Hills National Park, Sarawak State, Malaysia. This tropical rainforest receives about 3,500 millimetres (140 in) of rain yearly, with average temperatures ranging from 24 to 32 °C (75 to 90 °F). The structure of the fruit body allows it to quickly revive when dry by absorbing moisture from the air. The distinctive odour of the species may indicate that spore dispersal is mediated by animals.
