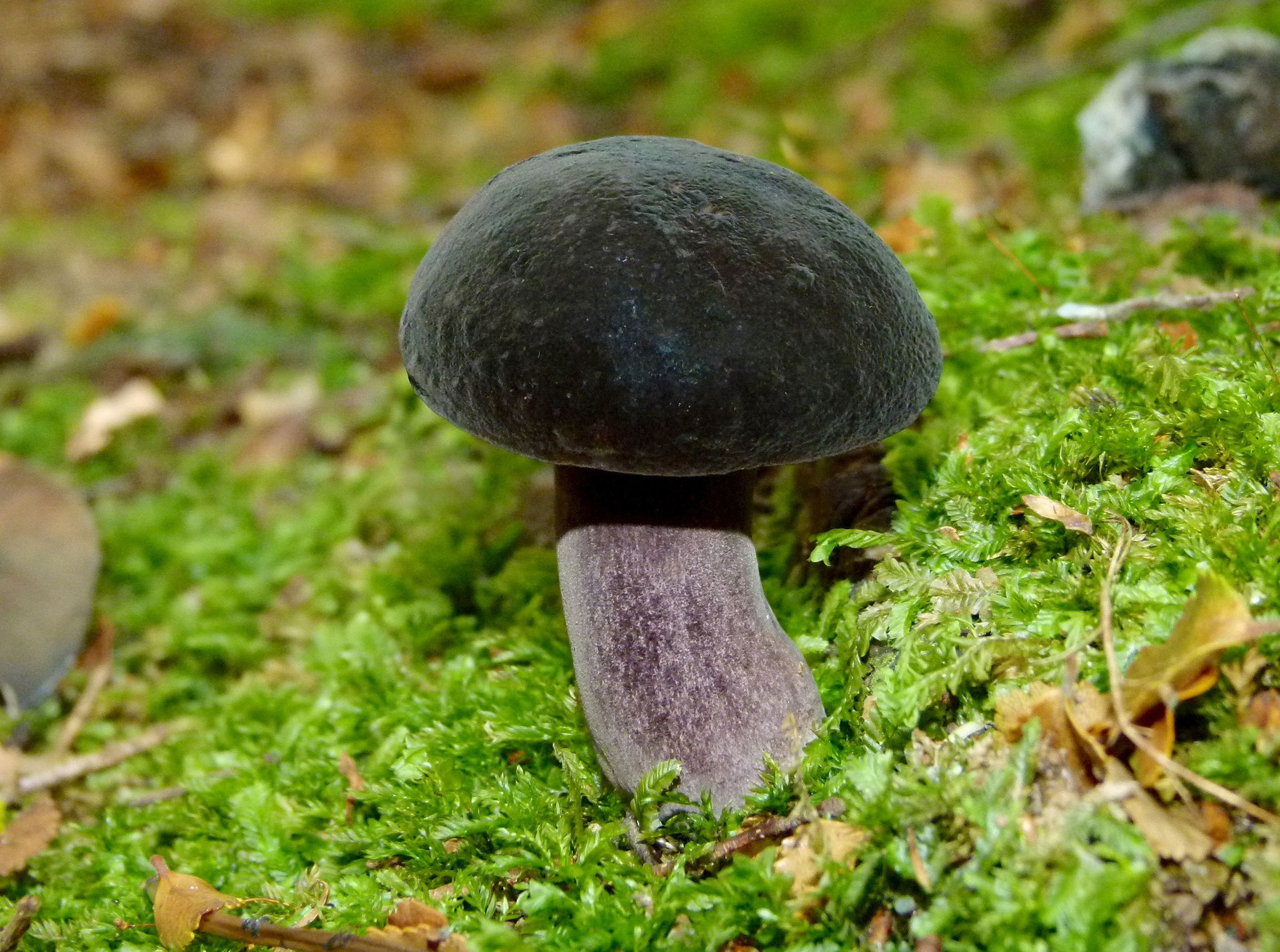

Scientific classification
- Kingdom: Fungi
- Division: Basidiomycota
- Class: Agaricomycetes
- Order: Boletales
- Family: Boletaceae
- Genus: Porphyrellus
- Species: P. formosus

Binomial name
- Porphyrellus formosus (G. Stev.) J. A. Cooper

Synonyms
- Tylopilus formosus G. Stev. (1962)

= Porphyrellus formosus =

Species of fungus

Porphyrellus formosus, the dark velvet bolete, is a species of bolete fungus in the family Boletaceae, first described as Tylopilus formosus by Greta Stevenson in 1962, and moved to Porphyrellus genus in 2014 by J. A. Cooper.

It is endemic to New Zealand, forming mycorrhiza with southern beeches and mānuka. Its distinguishing feature is all-black and velvety surface of cap and stalk. It initially has white pores that turn golden when aged.
