= Strobilomyces foveatus =

Scientific classification
- Kingdom: Fungi
- Division: Basidiomycota
- Class: Agaricomycetes
- Order: Boletales
- Family: Boletaceae
- Genus: Strobilomyces
- Species: S. foveatus

Binomial name
- Strobilomyces foveatus E.J.H.Corner (1972)

Species of fungus

Strobilomyces foveatus
- Mycological characteristics
- Pores on hymenium
- Cap is convex
- Hymenium is adnate
- Stipe is bare
- Spore print is black to brown
- Ecology is mycorrhizal
- Edibility is unknown

Strobilomyces foveatus is a little-known species of fungus in the family Boletaceae. It was first reported by mycologist E.J.H. Corner in 1972, from specimens he collected in Malaysia in 1959, and has since been found in Australia. Fruit bodies are characterized by the small dark brown to black conical scales covering the cap, and the net-like pattern of ridges on the upper stem. The roughly spherical spores measure about eight micrometres, and are densely covered with slender conical spines. The edibility of this species is unknown.

== Taxonomy and classification ==
Strobilomyces foveatus was first described scientifically by mycologist E.J.H. Corner in 1972, from specimens collected in Sarawak, Malaysia in 1959. It was one of several new Strobilomyces species he described in his monograph of Malaysian Boletaceae—the others were S. annulatus, S. mirandus, and S. mollis.

The fungus is classified in the section Strobilomyces of the genus Strobilomyces. Species in this section are characterized by having spores that may be either smooth or with short spines or warts, ridges or reticulations. The ornamentation is reduced or absent in the suprahilar region (a depressed area near the hilar appendage). The specific epithet foveatus is derived from the Latin adjective foveola, referring to a surface with pits or depressions.

== Description ==
The caps of the fruit bodies are between 7 and 10 cm (2.8 and 3.9 in) wide, with a convex shape. The cap surface is covered with dark brown to black erect scales between 1.5–3 by 1.5–2.5 mm. The stem is up to 12 cm (4.7 in) long; it is 1.2 cm (0.5 in) thick at the top, and 1.5 cm (0.6 in) thick at the bottom. The surface of the upper stem is strongly reticulate (covered with a network-like pattern) with individual meshes about 2–4 mm wide and 1–2 mm deep. The pores on the underside of the cap are between 0.5 and 1 mm wide, dirty white then gray, and they bruise a brownish-black color. The tubes which make up the pores are up to 1.2 cm (0.47 in) long. The flesh is thick and initially white, but will stain a brownish-black after exposure to the air.

The spores are 8–10 by 6.3–8.3 μm, and densely covered with slender conical spines about 0.5 μm tall. The abundant pleurocystidia (large sterile cells found on gill faces) are thin-walled, measuring up to 90 μm long by 1–20 μm wide, and ventricose (with a swelling on one side), with a narrow appendage up to 20 μm by 4–8 μm. The hyphae that make up the cap surface and the warts are branched, loosely interwoven, and sooty colored; the unclamped cells typically measure 17–45 by 9–26 μm. The surface of the stem is made of a compact mat of hyphae roughly 120 μm thick, that reduces to a sterile hymenium in the upper part of the stem.

Corner notes that the species "may be identical" with Strobilomyces echinatus Beeli, an African species with spores that measure 9.5–13 by 6.3–8.3 μm.

== Habitat and distribution ==
The province of Sarawak (red) in Malaysia

Corner collected specimens growing in humus on the forest floor, in Bako National Park (1°43′N 110°28′E) in Sarawak, Malaysia, in northern Borneo. It has also been collected from southern Queensland in Australia. Although it is not known definitively for Strobilomyces foveatus, all Strobilomyces species are suspected to be mycorrhizal.
