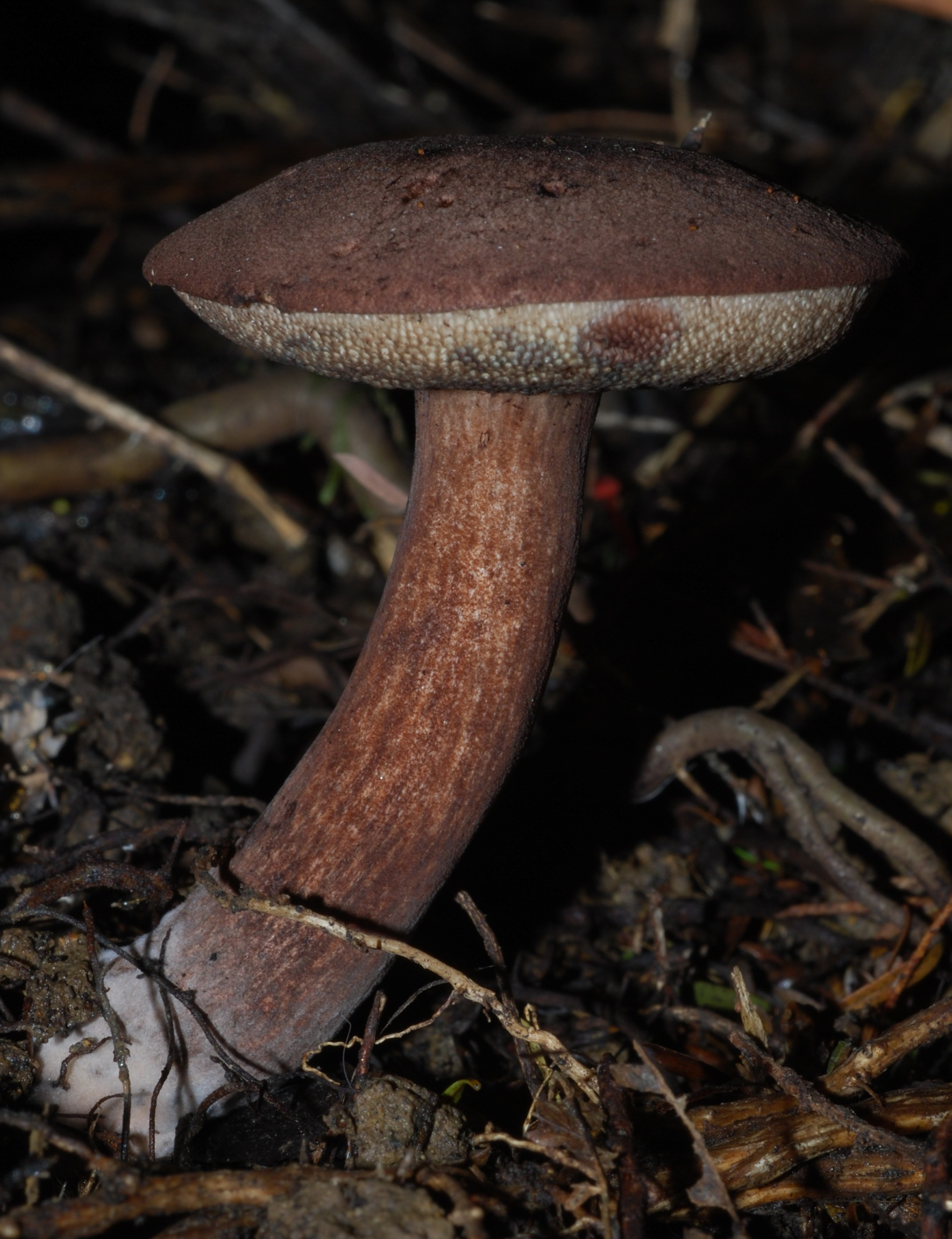

Scientific classification
- Domain: Eukaryota
- Kingdom: Fungi
- Division: Basidiomycota
- Class: Agaricomycetes
- Order: Boletales
- Family: Boletaceae
- Genus: Porphyrellus
- Species: P. brunneus

Binomial name
- Porphyrellus brunneus McNabb

Synonyms
- Tylopilus brunneus (McNabb) Wolfe (1980)

= Porphyrellus brunneus =

Species of fungus

Porphyrellus brunneus is a bolete fungus of the genus Tylopilus found in New Zealand. It was originally described by Robert Francis Ross McNabb in 1967.
