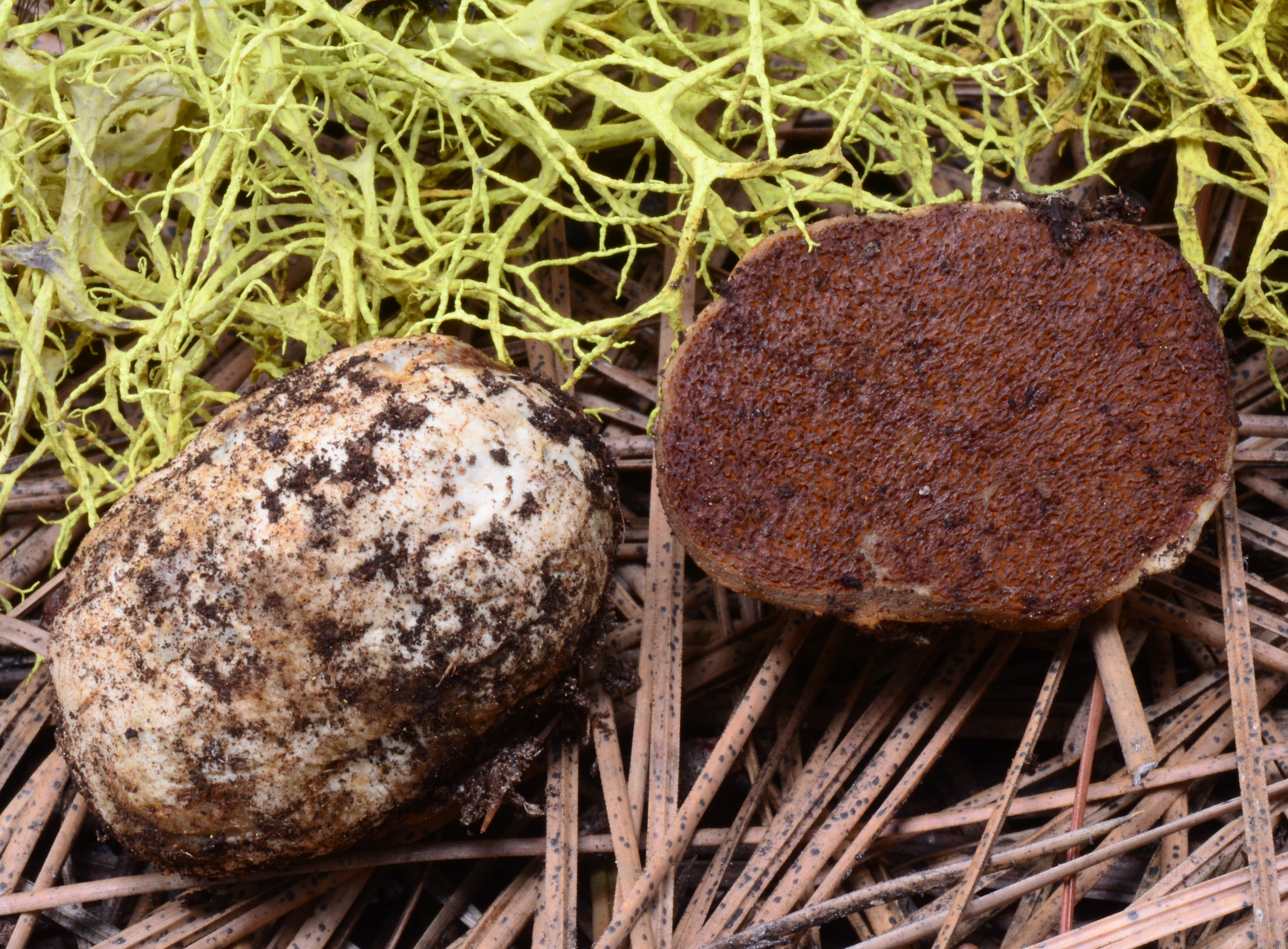

Scientific classification
- Kingdom: Fungi
- Division: Basidiomycota
- Class: Agaricomycetes
- Order: Agaricales
- Family: Hymenogastraceae
- Genus: Hymenogaster
- Species: H. subalpinus

Binomial name
- Hymenogaster subalpinus A.H.Sm. (1966)

= Hymenogaster subalpinus =

Species of fungus

Hymenogaster subalpinus is a species of mushroom-forming fungus in the family Hymenogastraceae.
