= Strobilomyces glabriceps =

Scientific classification
- Kingdom: Fungi
- Division: Basidiomycota
- Class: Agaricomycetes
- Order: Boletales
- Family: Boletaceae
- Genus: Strobilomyces
- Species: S. glabriceps

Binomial name
- Strobilomyces glabriceps (W.F.Chiu) (1948)

Species of fungus

Strobilomyces glabriceps is a species of bolete fungus in the family Suillaceae found in China. It was described as new to science in 1948 by Wei-Fan Chiu. The type collection was made in Kunming in June, 1938.

== Description ==
Fruit bodies have convex brown caps measuring up to 10 cm (3.9 in) in diameter. The surface is initially smooth, but becomes cracked as the bolete ages. Tubes on the cap underside are 2–2.5 cm (0.8–1.0 in) long, while the large angular pores are 4–5 mm across. Spores are spherical or nearly so, and measure 9–11 μm.

== Morphology ==
Strobilomyces glabriceps is characterized by its medium to large basidiomes (90–150 mm diameter), a nearly smooth, convex pileus that is 10 cm in diameter and "Carob Brown" in color, featuring gray-black, sizable, patch-like or pressed scales (5–14 mm diameter) or fine filaments. The stipe is 12 cm long, 15–30 mm thick, and "Russet Brown" with streaks and furfuraceous texture, usually tapering towards the base and slightly bulbous at the end. A cottony ring is present at the stipe's apex, with gray to dirty white and gray-black thin fluffy filaments on the upper and lower parts. The fungus has large hymenophoral pores (1–3 mm diameter) that are "Mikado Brown," decurrent on the stipe, angular or comb-like, and gray-black discolored upon exposure. The spores are dark brown under the microscope, globose to subglobose, reticulate, measuring 9-12(11) μm, with medium-sized meshes (2-4 μm diameter; Chiu 1948).

== Phylogeny and interpretation ==
The phylogeny of the genus Strobilomyces is recently being revised, and 49 phylogenetic species are being revealed in which 26 are potentially new species (Han et al. 2018). Phylogenetically, S. glabriceps is closely related to S. pteroreticulosporus and they fall into a clade that shares reticulate basidiospore mash (Han et al. 2020). Nevertheless, S. pteroreticulosporus stands out due to its petite, upright, conical scales (1–3 mm in height and 1–3 mm in diameter at the base) on the cap, a rusty red hue when exposed, and it is observed to found in forest dominated by Pinus spp. (Antonín 2015).

== Similar species ==
Based on morphological analysis, S. glabriceps is similar to S. glabellus J.Z. Ying and S. latirimosus J.Z. Ying, two species native to Yunnan China; but it from the letters in having decurrent tubes, and larger spores that 9-12 μm in diameter (Ying & Ma, 1985).

== Ecology ==
Species of Strobilomyces sect. Strobilomyces typically develop ectomycorrhizal connections with plants of families such as Dipterocarpaceae, Myrtaceae, Casuarinaceae, Fagaceae, and Pinaceae (Sato et al. 2017, Han et al. 2018), but specific mycorrhizal relationship has yet been observed on S. glabriceps.

== Habitat ==
Subtropical regions of China, Japan, and India, and it can be found either alone or in small groups (Han et al. 2020). A specimen is also identified from Kon Tum Plateau, Vietnam (Giang & Alexandrova 2021). The type specimen of S. glabriceps was collected in Kunming, China, on June 7, 1938 (Chiu 1948).

== Geographical distribution ==
Forest dominated by Fagaceae trees or mixed forests of Fagaceae and Pinaceae are the most common habitats for this species (Han et al. 2020).

== Use as food ==
This is an edible species in China, and it sometimes sold in market (Wang et al. 2004), especially in Yunnan Province. This species is known as "光盖松塔牛肝菌" in Chinese (Dai et al. 2010). Yu & Liu (2005) believed that Yunnan pine (Pinus yunnanensis) forest, one of the habitats of S. glabriceps, was being destroyed, and with the commercialization, local people often over-collected edible fungi, so many edible fungi were being vulnerable or endangered. risk; however, the extent of the threat to this species has not been assessed.
