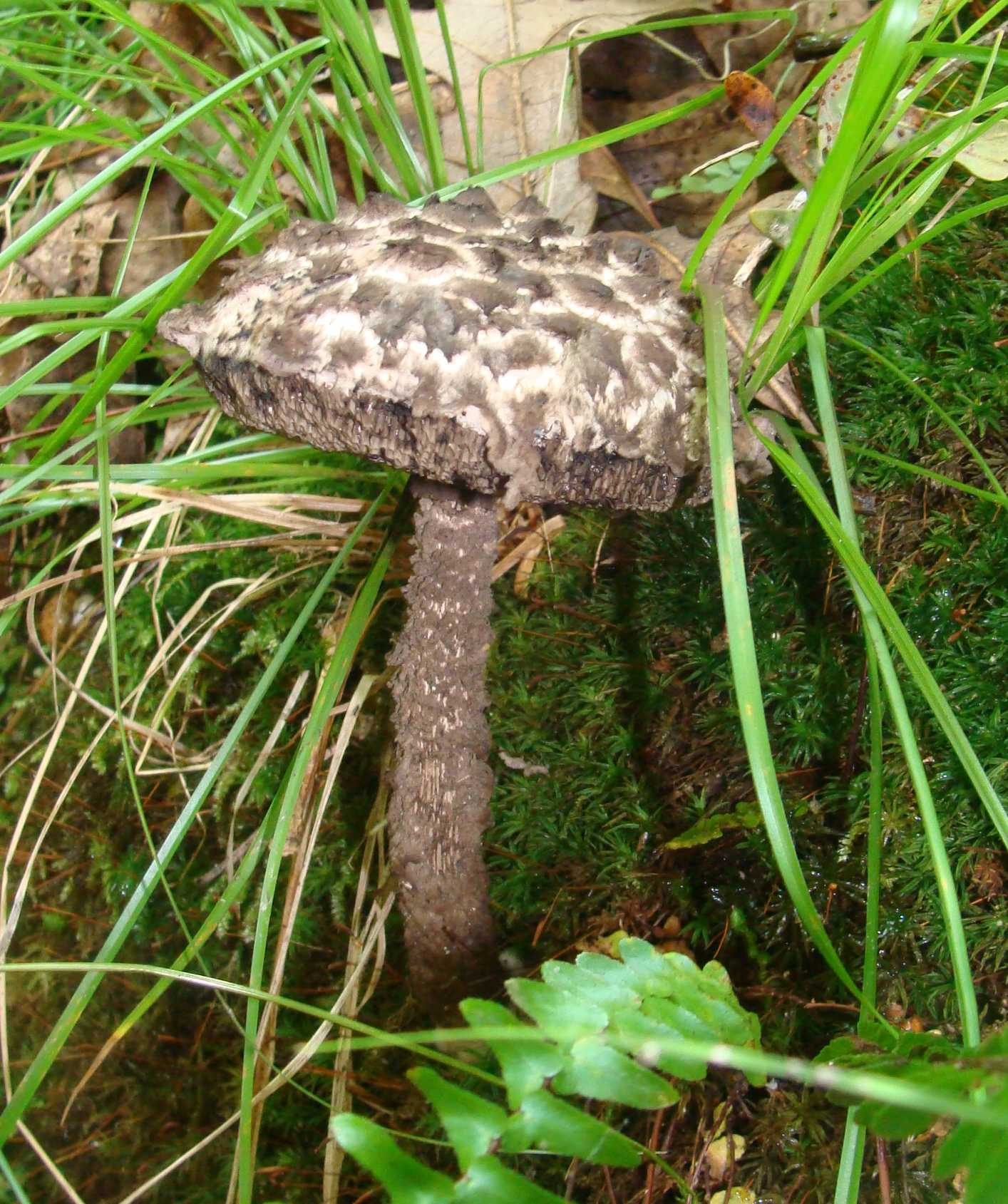

Scientific classification
- Domain: Eukaryota
- Kingdom: Fungi
- Division: Basidiomycota
- Class: Agaricomycetes
- Order: Boletales
- Family: Boletaceae
- Genus: Strobilomyces
- Species: S. strobilaceus

Binomial name
- Strobilomyces strobilaceus (Scop.) Berk. (1851)

Synonyms
- Boletus strobilaceus Scop. (1770); Strobilomyces floccopus (Vahl) Karst. (1882)

= Strobilomyces strobilaceus =

Species of fungus

Strobilomyces strobilaceus Mycological characteristics
- Pores on hymenium
- Cap is convex
- Hymenium is adnate
- Stipe has a ring
- Spore print is blackish-brown to black
- Ecology is mycorrhizal
- Edibility is edible

Strobilomyces strobilaceus, also called Strobilomyces floccopus and commonly known as old man of the woods, is a species of fungus in the family Boletaceae.

The fruit bodies are characterized by soft, dark scales on the cap surface. The species is native to Eurasia and North America.

== Taxonomy ==
Strobilomyces strobilaceus is classified in the section Strobilomyces of the genus Strobilomyces. Species in this section are characterized by having spores that may be either smooth or with short spines or warts, ridges or reticulations. The ornamentation is reduced or absent in the suprahilar region—a depressed area near the hilar appendage.

It was first described scientifically by the Italian naturalist Giovanni Antonio Scopoli in 1770 as a species of Boletus.

== Description ==
The caps of the fruit bodies are between 4 and 11 cm (1 1/2 and 4 1/4 in) wide, with a convex shape and a villous, involute margin. The cap surface is covered with tuft-like, dark grey to brown erect scales. The stipe is up to 14 cm (5 1/2 in) long and 2 cm (3/4 in) thick. It is coloured like the cap and has a woolly surface and a thick, ascending annulus or merely bands of colour from the partial veil. The pores on the underside of the cap are angular, light grey and turning blackish with age. The flesh is thick and initially white, but stains pink; the stains will turn blackish.

The dark brown to black spores are 9–15 by 8–12 μm, short elliptic and are covered with a mesh-like ornament. The spore print is blackish.

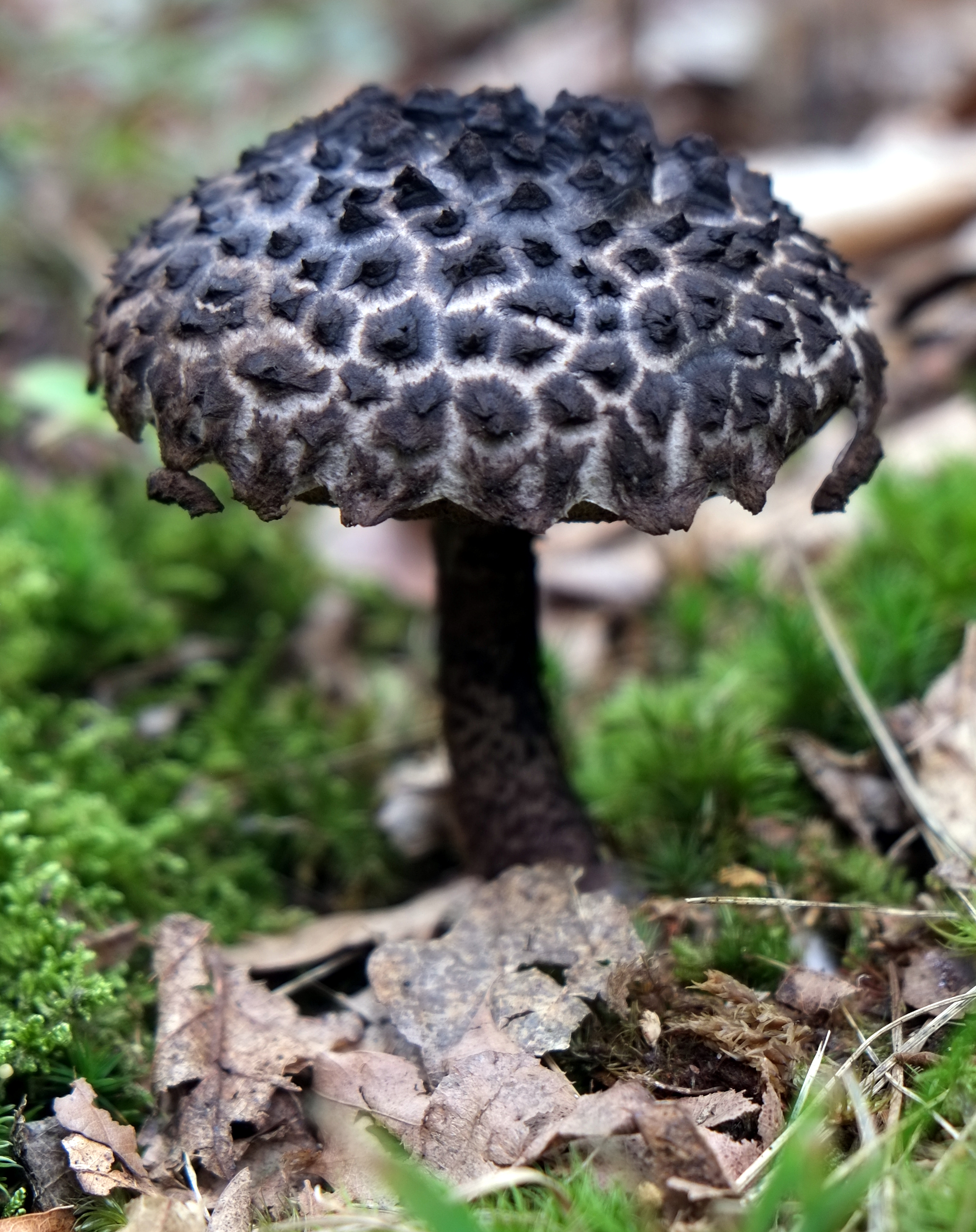
Pennsylvania specimen

=== Similar species ===
Strobilomyces confusus has a slightly smaller cap with smaller and stiff scales. Its spores have irregular ridges that resemble a partial mesh. The cap of S. dryophilus is coloured a dull grey-pink to pinkish-tan and produces spores with a complete mesh.

== Habitat and distribution ==
Strobilomyces strobilaceus is found solitary or in groups in deciduous as well as coniferous forests in low mountain ranges and alpine areas of North America (in the east), Europe, and Asia (Iran and Taiwan). It is less common in lowlands. The fungus appears between July and October under oak and beech trees.

== Uses ==
Young specimens are edible, with a choice flavour.

== In culture ==
On 27 February 2014, the postal administration of Switzerland issued a 50-centime definitive postage stamp depicting the species.

== See also ==
- List of North American boletes
