= SpongeBob SquarePants (character) =

Protagonist of the SpongeBob SquarePants animated series

- SpongeBob SquarePants character
- First appearance: "Help Wanted"; SpongeBob SquarePants; May 1, 1999
- Created by: Stephen Hillenburg
- Designed by: Stephen Hillenburg
- Voiced by: Tom Kenny (Note: SpongeBob is voiced by Tom Kenny in almost all media. Other actors have portrayed him on special occasions; for example, Peter Straus provided his singing voice in "Ripped Pants" and Antonio Raul Corbo voiced a younger SpongeBob in Sponge on the Run.)
- Portrayed by: Ethan Slater (Broadway)

In-universe information
- Species: Yellow tube sponge
- Gender: Male
- Occupation: Fry cook
- Family: Harold SquarePants (father); Margaret SquarePants (mother); Grandma SquarePants (grandmother)

SpongeBob SquarePants is a fictional character and the main protagonist of the Nickelodeon animated television series of the same name. He is characterized by his optimistic and childlike attitude. He lives in the fictional underwater city of Bikini Bottom, where he regularly gets into absurd and humorous situations. He is voiced by Tom Kenny.

SpongeBob was created by Stephen Hillenburg, an artist and marine science educator. SpongeBob's name is derived from "Bob the Sponge", a character from Hillenburg's unpublished educational book The Intertidal Zone. Hillenburg created the book while teaching marine biology to visitors of the Ocean Institute in Dana Point, California, during the 1980s. After working as a director on the animated series Rocko's Modern Life, Hillenburg began developing his own animated series based on The Intertidal Zone. SpongeBob's first appearance was in the SpongeBob SquarePants pilot episode, "Help Wanted", which premiered on May 1, 1999.

SpongeBob has become popular among children and teenagers. The character has garnered a positive response from media critics and is frequently named as one of the greatest cartoon characters of all time.

== Role in SpongeBob SquarePants ==
SpongeBob is a good-natured, naive, and enthusiastic sea sponge. (Note: In The SpongeBob Musical, he is identified as an Aplysina fistularis, a yellow tube sponge.) He lives in a submerged pineapple with his pet snail, Gary, in the fictional underwater city of Bikini Bottom, which is also home to other anthropomorphic creatures. SpongeBob is often seen in the company of his best friend and next-door neighbor, the starfish Patrick Star. SpongeBob is obsessively attached to his job as a fry cook at a local fast food restaurant, the Krusty Krab. His boss is Mr. Krabs, a greedy red crab who becomes a father figure to him. SpongeBob's ill-tempered and snobbish neighbor, the octopus Squidward Tentacles, works as the Krusty Krab's cashier.

SpongeBob's hobbies include fishing for jellyfish, blowing bubbles, and practicing karate with his friend Sandy Cheeks, a squirrel from Texas. His greatest goal in life is to obtain his boat-driving license from Mrs. Puff's boating school, but he often panics and crashes when driving, causing him to fail the course over and over again. SpongeBob's highly optimistic attitude makes him ignorant to negativity from others. As an example, he believes that Squidward enjoys his company, even though Squidward is usually annoyed by SpongeBob's behavior.

== Development ==
=== Conception ===
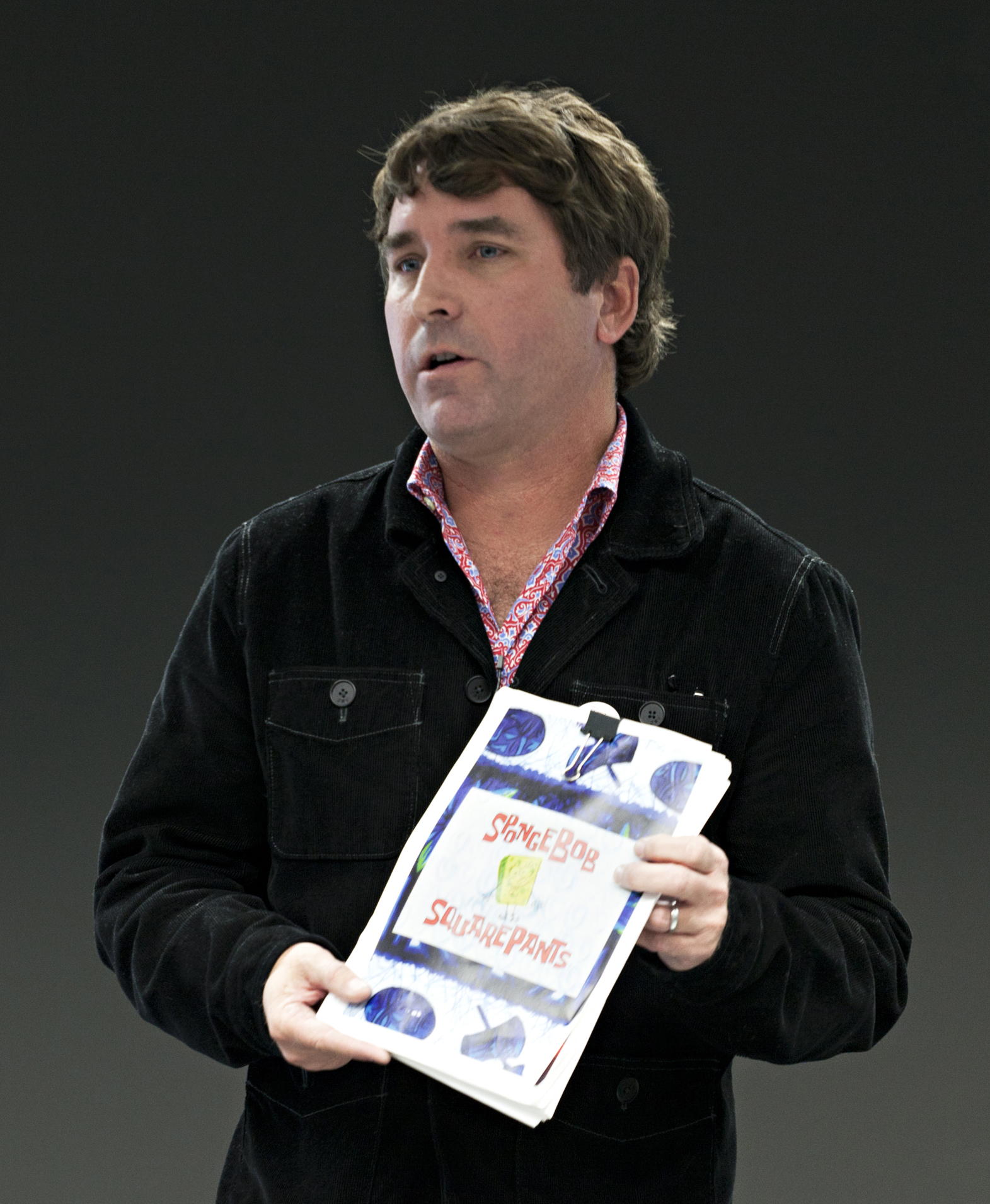
Stephen Hillenburg, creator of SpongeBob SquarePants, pictured in 2011

SpongeBob SquarePants creator Stephen Hillenburg became fascinated with the ocean as a child and began developing his artistic abilities at a young age. Hillenburg pursued both during college, majoring in marine biology and minoring in art at Humboldt State University. After graduating in 1984, he joined the Ocean Institute, an organization in Dana Point, California, dedicated to educating the public about marine science and maritime history.

While Hillenburg was working at the Ocean Institute, he created a comic book precursor to SpongeBob titled The Intertidal Zone. The comic featured various anthropomorphic lifeforms, many of which would evolve into SpongeBob characters. After attending an animation festival, Hillenburg decided to study experimental animation at California Institute of the Arts. He later met Joe Murray, who offered him working on the Nickelodeon animated series Rocko's Modern Life, which began airing in 1993.

Martin Olson, one of the writers for Rocko's Modern Life, read The Intertidal Zone and encouraged Hillenburg to create a television series with a similar concept. (Note: Attributed to multiple references:) Hillenburg began to develop some of the characters from The Intertidal Zone, including Bob the Sponge. He wanted his series to stand out from other popular cartoons of the time, many of which were buddy comedies like The Ren & Stimpy Show. Hillenburg decided to focus on a single main character: a sea sponge, the "weirdest" sea creature he could think of. Bob the Sponge resembled a real-life sea sponge, and Hillenburg used this design in the early stages. (Note: Attributed to multiple references:) (Note: Attributed to multiple references:) In determining the character's behavior, Hillenburg was inspired by innocent, childlike figures that he enjoyed, such as Charlie Chaplin, Laurel and Hardy, Jerry Lewis, and Pee-wee Herman. (Note: Attributed to multiple references:)

=== Creation and design ===
An early drawing of the character by Hillenburg

Hillenburg had made several "horrible impersonations" before he finally conceived of his character. He compared the concept to Laurel and Hardy and Pee-wee Herman saying, "I think SpongeBob [was] born out of my love of Laurel and Hardy shorts. You've got that kind of idiot-buddy situation – that was a huge influence. SpongeBob was inspired by that kind of character: the Innocent – à la Stan Laurel."

The first concept sketch portrayed the character wearing a red hat with a green base and a white business shirt with a tie. SpongeBob's look gradually changed. He also wore brown pants used in the final design. SpongeBob was designed to be a childlike character who was goofy and optimistic in a style similar to that made famous by Jerry Lewis.

Originally, the character was to be named SpongeBoy (and the series named SpongeBoy Ahoy!), but this name was already in use for a pencil product. This was discovered after voice acting for the original seven-minute pilot was recorded. Upon learning this, Hillenburg knew that the character's name still had to contain "Sponge" so viewers would not mistake him for a "Cheese Man". In 1997, he decided to use the name "SpongeBob" with "SquarePants" as a family name, with the latter referring to the character's square shape and having a "nice ring to it".

Before commissioning SpongeBob as a full series, Nickelodeon executives insisted that it would not be popular unless the main character was a child who went to school. This conflicted with Hillenburg's idea for SpongeBob to be an adult character. He eventually compromised by adding a new character to the main cast, Mrs. Puff, whose occupation as a driving instructor allowed SpongeBob to both appear as an adult and go to school, satisfying both Hillenburg and Nickelodeon. Hillenburg was happy with the compromise and described the character's conception as a "positive thing" that came out of it.

Episodes from 2000 and 2001 have given SpongeBob's birthdate as July 14, 1986, but his age is left unclear throughout the series.

Like real sea sponges, SpongeBob has the ability to transform (and regenerate) the shape of his body, for example into the shape of Texas or his friends' faces to humor himself.

=== Voice ===
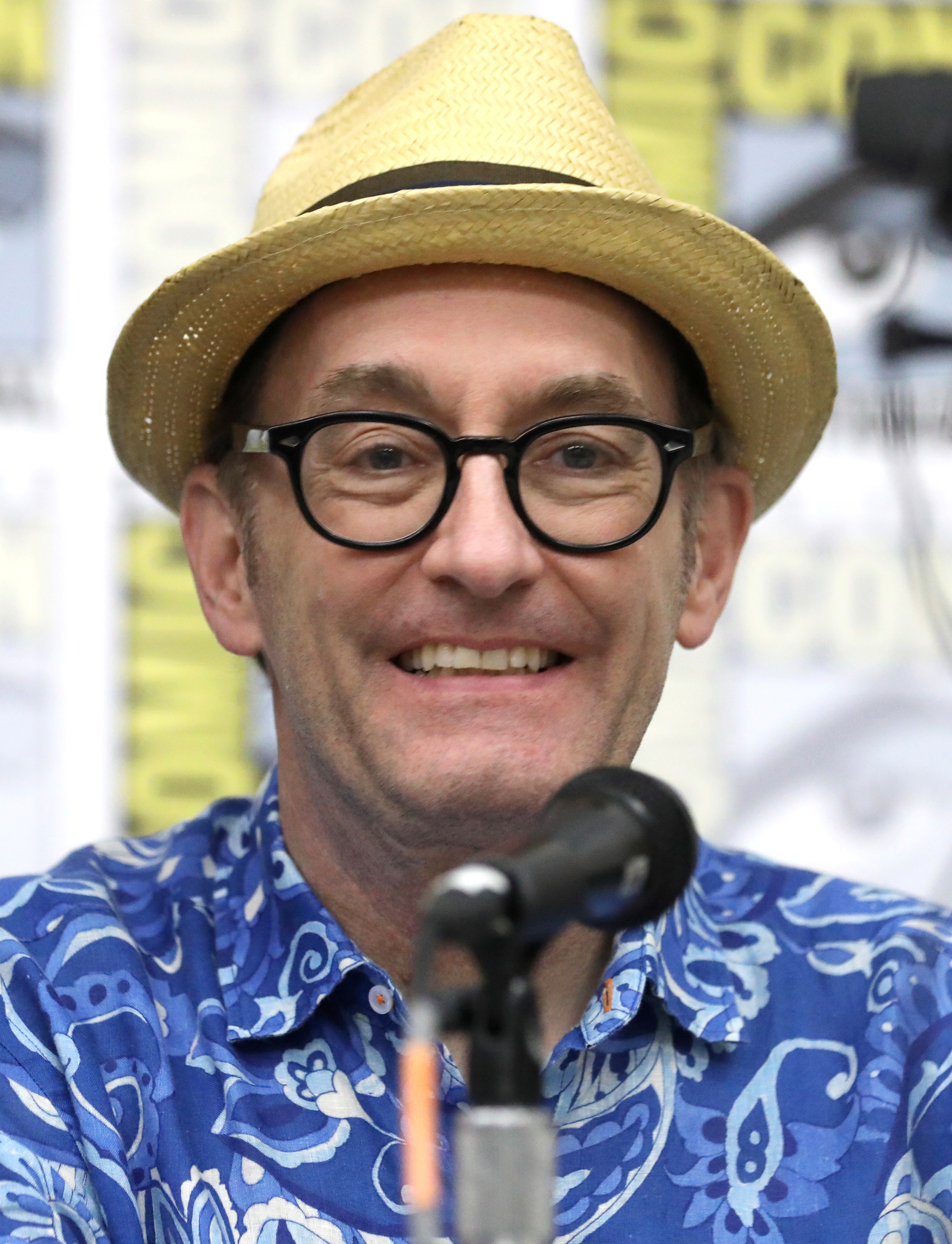
Tom Kenny (pictured in 2023) provides the voice of SpongeBob

SpongeBob is voiced by veteran voice actor Tom Kenny, who had worked previously with Hillenburg on Rocko's Modern Life. When Hillenburg created SpongeBob SquarePants, he approached Kenny to voice the character. Hillenburg used Kenny's and other people's personalities while creating SpongeBob's.

Kenny said in an episode of WTF with Marc Maron that the voice was based on a frustrated dwarf actor he encountered while auditioning for a television commercial. Kenny had originally used SpongeBob's voice for a minor background character in Rocko's Modern Life. At first, Kenny forgot the voice because he had used it only on that occasion. Hillenburg remembered it when he was coming up with SpongeBob, however, and played a video clip of the Rocko episode to remind Kenny of the voice. When Hillenburg heard Kenny do the voice, he said, "That's it—I don't want to hear anybody else do the voice. We've got SpongeBob." Kenny recalled that Nickelodeon was unsure of his casting, insisting more casting auditions. The network hoped to find a celebrity for the part. Kenny noted: "But one of the advantages of having a strong creator is that the creator can say, 'No, I like that—I don't care about celebrities'." Kenny recalls Hillenburg "let them know that in no uncertain terms." SpongeBob's high-pitched laugh was specifically designed to be unique according to Kenny. They wanted an annoying laugh in the tradition of Popeye and Woody Woodpecker.

Throughout the series, SpongeBob's voice evolved from "low-key" to high-pitched. Kenny said, "I hear the change... It's mostly a question of the pitch." He said that, "It's unconscious on my part" because "I don't wake up and think, 'Hmm, I'm going to change SpongeBob's voice today, just for the hell of it'." He described it as "like erosion: a very slow process. As time goes on, you need to bring him to different places and more places, the more stories and scripts you do." Contrasting first-season episodes to those of the seventh season, Kenny said that "there's a bit of a change [in the voice], but I don't think it's that extreme at all."

When SpongeBob SquarePants was prepared for broadcast in languages other than English, the voice actors dubbing SpongeBob's voice used Kenny's rendition of the character as a starting point but added unique elements. For example, in the French version of the series, SpongeBob speaks with a slight Daffy Duck-style lisp.

In early 2021, SpongeBob became one of the popular character voices available on 15.ai, an artificial intelligence text-to-speech web application that allows users to generate speech in the voices of fictional characters. Critics reported that the application replicated SpongeBob's voice particularly well, with Natalie Clayton of PC Gamer noting that the character's distinctive shrill voice was convincingly recreated through the application. Fans created various content using 15.ai featuring SpongeBob saying custom phrases, which Peter Paltridge of Anime Superhero News described as "nearly indistinguishable".

== Reception ==
=== Critical reception ===
Throughout SpongeBob SquarePants' first run, SpongeBob became instantly popular with both children and adults . In June 2010, Entertainment Weekly named him one of the "100 Greatest Characters of the Last 20 Years". TV Guide listed SpongeBob SquarePants at number nine on its "50 Greatest Cartoon Characters of All Time" list.

James Poniewozik of Time magazine considered the character "the anti-Bart Simpson, temperamentally and physically: his head is as squared-off and neat as Bart's is unruly, and he has a personality to match–conscientious, optimistic and blind to the faults in the world and those around him." The New York Times critic Joyce Millman said, "His relentless good cheer would be irritating if he weren't so darned lovable and his world so excellently strange... Like Pee-wee's Playhouse, SpongeBob joyfully dances on the fine line between childhood and adulthood, guilelessness and camp, the warped and the sweet." Robert Thompson, a professor of communications and director of the Center for the Study of Popular Television at Syracuse University, told The New York Times:

There is something kind of unique about [SpongeBob]. It seems to be a refreshing breath from the pre-irony era. There's no sense of the elbow-in-rib, a tongue-in-cheek aesthetic that so permeates the rest of American culture–including kids' shows like the Rugrats. I think what's subversive about it is it's so incredibly naive–deliberately. Because there's nothing in it that's trying to be hip or cool or anything else, hipness can be grafted onto it.

TV Guide listed SpongeBob at number nine on its list of the 50 Greatest Cartoon Characters of All Time in 2002. In June 2010, Entertainment Weekly named SpongeBob one of the 100 Greatest Characters of the Last 20 Years.

=== Criticism and controversy ===
In 2005, a promotional video which showed SpongeBob, along with other characters from children's shows, singing to promote diversity and tolerance was criticized by a Christian fundamentalist group in the United States because they felt the SpongeBob character was being used as an advocate for homosexuality, despite the video containing "no reference to sex, sexual lifestyle or sexual identity." James Dobson of Focus on the Family accused the video's makers of promoting homosexuality because a gay rights group had sponsored the video.

The incident led to the question whether SpongeBob is a homosexual character. In 2002, when SpongeBob's popularity with gay men grew (largely due to the episode Rock-A-Bye Bivalve, where SpongeBob wore drag and raised an adopted baby clam with Patrick), Hillenburg denied the suggestion. He clarified that he considers the character to be "somewhat asexual." The term "asexual" was specifically used when discussing the character's sexual orientation rather than the context of exclusive asexual reproduction. SpongeBob's exact species is the Aplysina fistularis sponge, a species of sponge capable of sexual reproduction in addition to asexual reproduction. The character also has two biological parents. After Dobson's comments on the alleged pro-gay content of the show, Hillenburg repeated his assertion that sexual preference was never considered during the creation of the show.

Dobson later said that his comments were taken out of context and that his original complaints were not with SpongeBob or any of the characters in the video but with the organization that sponsored it, the We Are Family Foundation. Dobson noted that the foundation had posted pro-homosexual material on its website, but later removed it. After the controversy, John H. Thomas, the United Church of Christ's general minister and president, said they would welcome SpongeBob into their ministry. He said, "Jesus didn't turn people away. Neither do we."

Jeffrey P. Dennis, author of the journal article "The Same Thing We Do Every Night: Signifying Same-Sex Desire in Television Cartoons", argued that SpongeBob and Sandy are not romantically in love while adding that he believed that SpongeBob and Patrick "are paired with arguably erotic intensity." Dennis noted the two are "not consistently coded as romantic partners," since they live in separate residences, and have distinct groups of friends but claimed that in the series, "the possibility of same-sex desire is never excluded."

In April 2009, in a tie-in partnership with Burger King and Nickelodeon, Burger King released an advertisement featuring SpongeBob and Sir Mix-a-Lot singing "Baby Got Back". Parents and the Campaign for a Commercial-Free Childhood (CCFC) protested the ad for being sexist and inappropriately sexual, considering that SpongeBob's audience includes preschoolers. CCFC director Susan Linn said the usage of SpongeBob promoting sexualized images of women was "utterly reprehensible". In an official statement released by Burger King, the company claimed the campaign was aimed at parents.

In June 2020, Nickelodeon shared a tweet in celebration of Pride Month, featuring SpongeBob SquarePants wearing a rainbow-colored tie. Along with SpongeBob, the tweet included photos of transgender actor Michael D. Cohen, who plays Schwoz Schwartz on Henry Danger, and Korra from the Avatar spin-off show The Legend of Korra, who is depicted as being in a same-sex relationship. Some users online interpreted the post as being the network's way of quietly announcing that the character was gay; series creator Hillenburg has previously stated he considered SpongeBob to be asexual.

=== Cultural impact and legacy ===
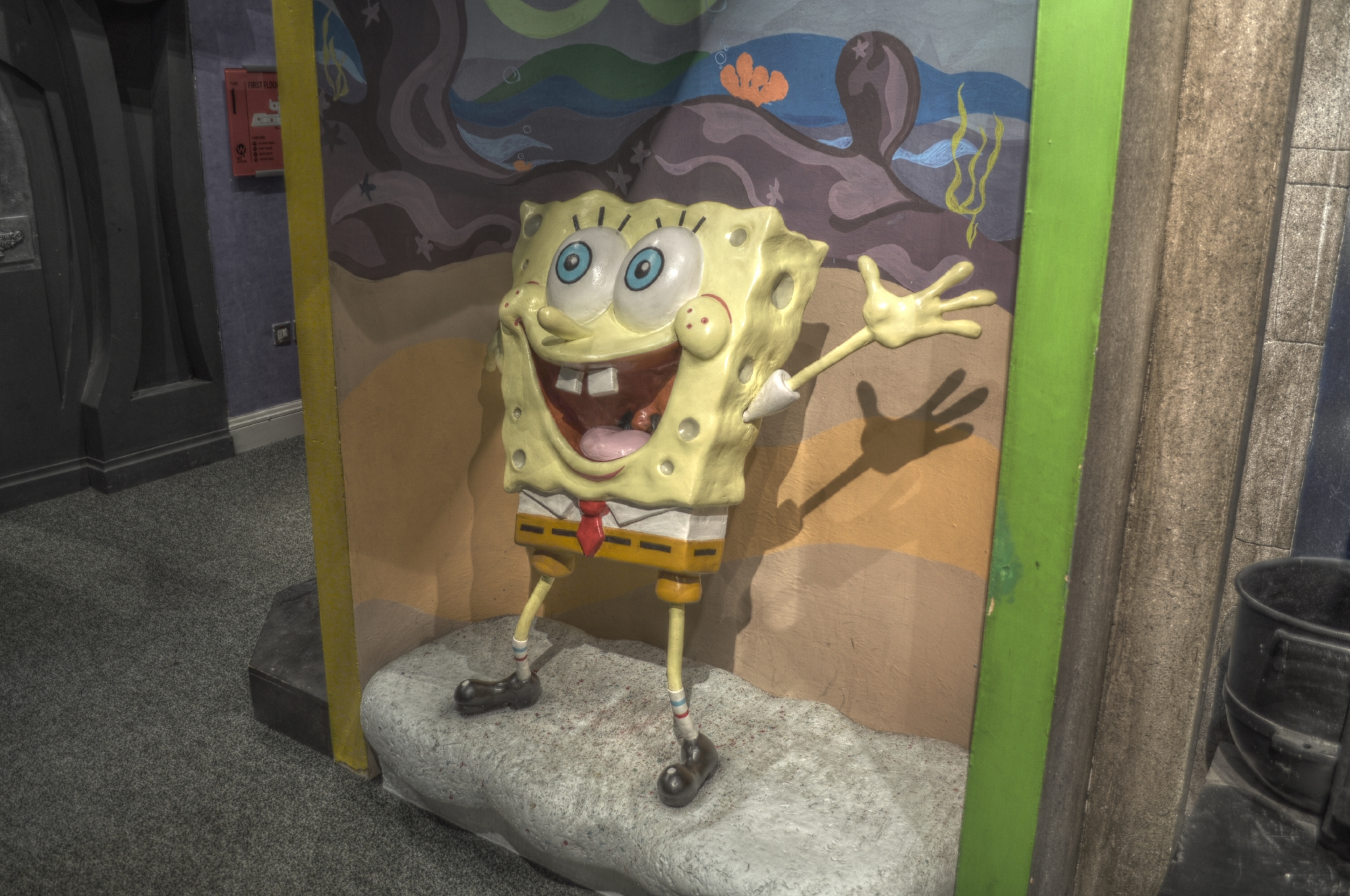
SpongeBob SquarePants wax statue in the National Wax Museum Plus, in Dublin, Ireland

Throughout SpongeBob SquarePants' run, the SpongeBob character became very popular with viewers of all ages. His popularity spread from Nickelodeon's original demographic of two- to eleven-year-olds, to teenagers and adults, was popular on college campuses and with celebrities such as Sigourney Weaver and Bruce Willis. Salon.com's Stephanie Zacharek feels that the unadulterated innocence of SpongeBob is what makes him so appealing. Since at least 2002, SpongeBob became popular with gay men due to his "flamboyant lifestyle and tolerant attitude", despite Stephen Hillenburg asserting he is asexual.

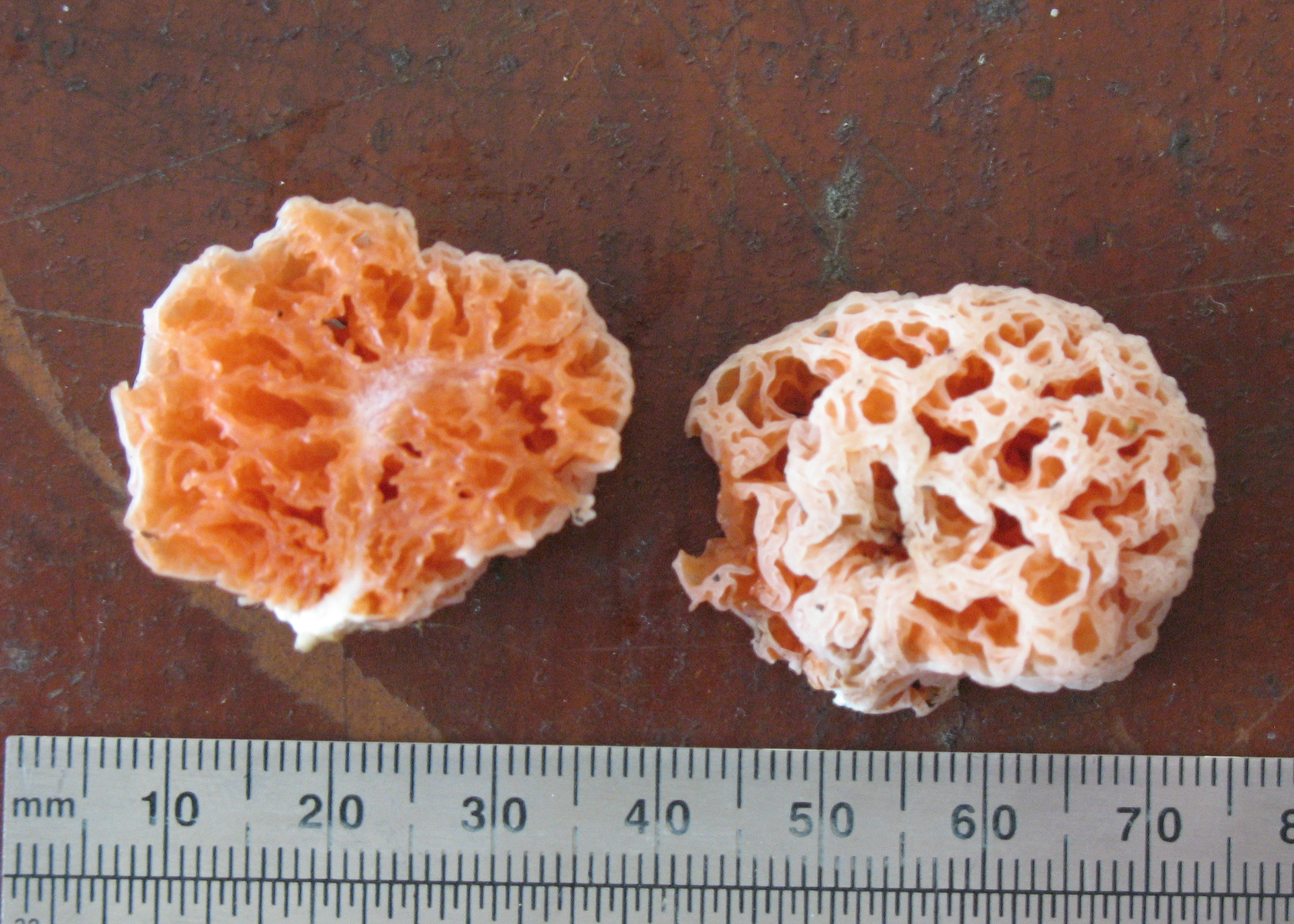
Spongiforma squarepantsii is a species of fungi named after SpongeBob SquarePants.

In July 2009, the Madame Tussauds wax museum in New York City unveiled a wax sculpture of SpongeBob, the first fictional character to be featured there. In May 2011, a new species of mushroom, Spongiforma squarepantsii, named after SpongeBob, was described in the journal Mycologia. The authors note that the hymenium, when viewed using scanning electron microscopy, somewhat resembles a "seafloor covered with tube sponges, reminiscent of the fictitious home of SpongeBob." Although the epithet was originally rejected by Mycologia's editors as "too frivolous", the authors insisted that "we could name it whatever we liked." Since 2004, SpongeBob has appeared as a balloon in the Macy's Thanksgiving Day Parade.

SpongeBob has also become a fashion trend. In 2008, A Bathing Ape released SpongeBob-themed shoes. Singer Pharrell Williams backed a line of SpongeBob T-shirts and shoes. In 2014, the character was among the popular culture icons referenced by American fashion designer Jeremy Scott in his Moschino debut collection at the Milan Fashion Week.

In Egypt's Tahrir Square, after the Egyptian Revolution of 2011, SpongeBob became a fashion phenomenon, appearing on various merchandise items from hijabs to boxer shorts. The phenomenon led to the creation of the Tumblr project called "SpongeBob on the Nile", founded by American students Andrew Leber and Elisabeth Jaquette, that attempts to document every appearance of SpongeBob in Egypt. Sherief Elkeshta cited the phenomenon in an essay about the incoherent state of politics in Egypt in an independent monthly paper titled Midan Masr. He wrote, "Why isn't he [SpongeBob] at least holding a Molotov cocktail? Or raising a fist?" The phenomenon has even spread to Libya, where a Libyan rebel in SpongeBob dress was photographed celebrating the revolution.

During a panel at a fan convention in 2024, Kenny recounted a moment from a previous convention when he was asked by an autistic fan whether "SpongeBob himself [is] autistic as a character", to which he responded "Yes, of course he is. [...] That's his superpower, the same way that's your superpower." Video footage of this account went viral, prompting Kenny to clarify during an interview with Entertainment Weekly at the convention three days later that he did not intend for this to be an official public statement about the character, and called it a "private moment that I had with a fan, but it seems like it's been empowering and helpful to people out there." A decade prior, on the WTF with Marc Maron podcast, Kenny described SpongeBob as being "a little autistic. Obsessed with his job, very hardworking, gets really really deep into something." Fans on online forums have noted other behavior exhibited by SpongeBob can be interpreted as signs of autism, such as "meltdowns, blindness to sarcasm and inability to read social cues". Other SpongeBob voice actors, including Mr. Lawrence and Clancy Brown, have agreed that the character of SpongeBob connects with autistic children "at every level of the spectrum".

== Merchandising ==
SpongeBob's translated well into related merchandise sales. In 2002, SpongeBob SquarePants dolls sold at a rate of 75,000 per week, which was faster than Tickle Me Elmo dolls were selling at the time. SpongeBob was popular in Japan, specifically with Japanese women. Nickelodeon's parent company Viacom purposefully targeted its marketing at women there as a way to build the SpongeBob SquarePants brand. Skeptics initially doubted that SpongeBob could be popular in Japan as the character's design is very different from the already popular designs for Hello Kitty and Pikachu. The character inspired a soap-filled sponge product manufactured by SpongeTech.

In early 2009, the Simmons Jewelry Co. released a $75,000 diamond pendant as part of a SpongeBob collection.

On May 17, 2013, Build-A-Bear Workshop introduced a new SpongeBob SquarePants collection in stores and online in North America.

SpongeBob also inspired an automobile design. On July 13, 2013, Toyota, with Nickelodeon, unveiled plans for a SpongeBob-inspired Toyota Highlander. The 2014 Toyota Highlander concept vehicle was launched as part of a SpongeBob Day promotion at that day's game between the Giants and Padres in San Diego, and subsequently visited seven U.S. locations including the Nickelodeon Suites Resort Orlando in Florida.
