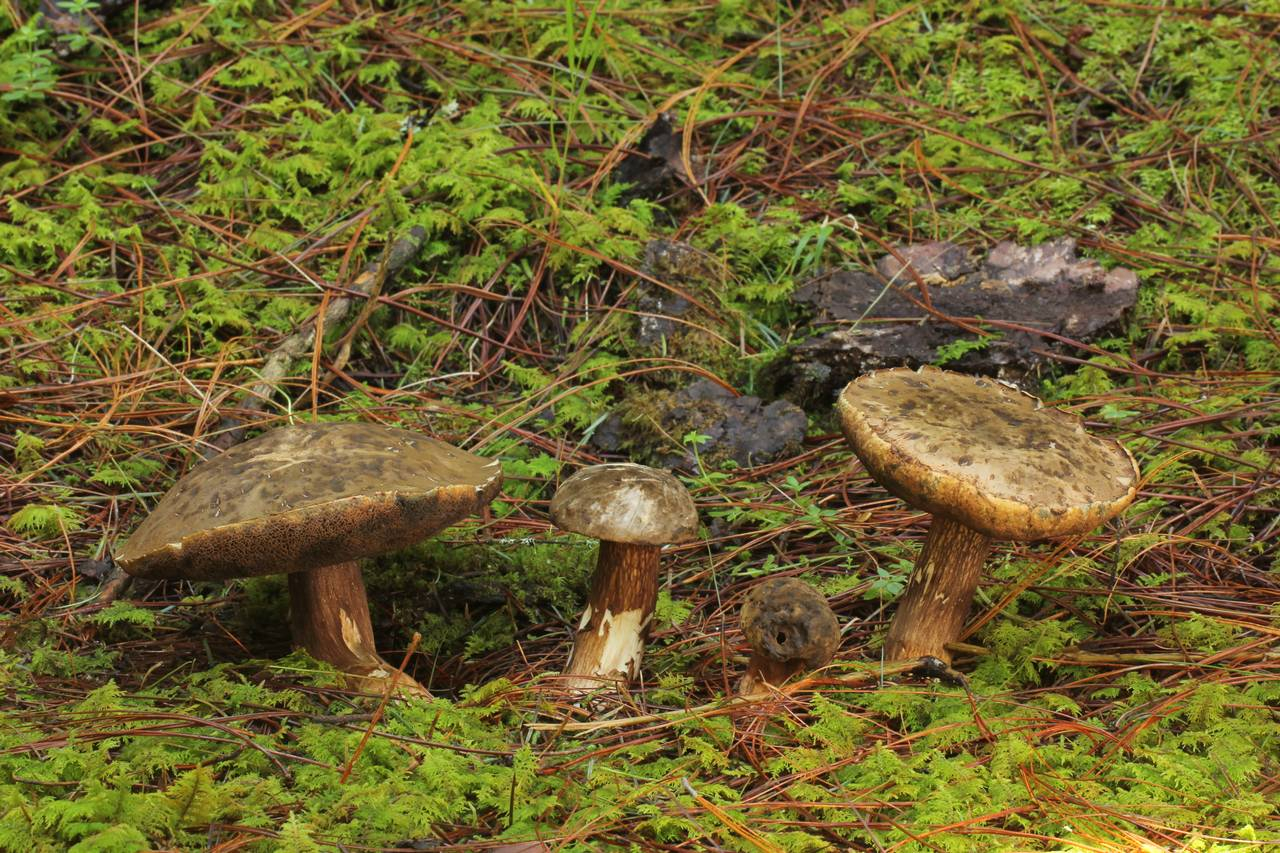

Scientific classification
- Kingdom: Fungi
- Division: Basidiomycota
- Class: Agaricomycetes
- Order: Boletales
- Family: Boletaceae
- Genus: Porphyrellus
- Species: P. porphyrosporus

Binomial name
- Porphyrellus porphyrosporus (Fr. & Hök) E.-J.Gilbert (1931)

Synonyms
- Boletus porphyrosporus Fr. & Hök (1835); Phaeoporus porphyrosporus (Fr. & Hök) Bataille (1908); Tylopilus porphyrosporus (Fr. & Hök) A.H.Sm. & Thiers (1971)

= Porphyrellus porphyrosporus =

Porphyrellus porphyrosporus
- Mycological characteristics
- Pores on hymenium
- Cap is convex
- Hymenium is adnate
- Stipe is bare
- Spore print is purple to brown
- Ecology is mycorrhizal
- Edibility is inedible

Porphyrellus porphyrosporus, commonly known as the dusky bolete, is a rare fungus belonging to the family Boletaceae. With its purple-brown cap and stem, P. porphyrosporus is not easy to spot, despite its large size. It is a large (both cap diameter and stem length up to 15 cm) brown bolete. Found in Europe and North America in summer and autumn, the species occurs under trees.

== Description ==
This mushroom has a dark brown cap, usually with a paler margin. Initially convex, caps expand and sometimes become irregularly lobed. It is 6 to 15 cm (2 1/4 to 6 in) in diameter when fully expanded, and the caps have soft buff flesh with a vinaceous tinge. The tubes are similar in colour to the cap, and when cut or bruised, turn blue-green. The stem is 5 to 16 cm (2 to 6 1/4 in) tall and 1 to 3 cm (3/8 to 1 1/8 in) in diameter, equal or clavate, tobacco brown and slightly velvety to the touch when young, becoming smooth as the fruit body matures. The flesh is white, producing blue stains which change color. The mushroom has a mild to pungent smell and a mild to bitter taste. The spore print is reddish-brown.

=== Similar species ===
It might overlap with P. atrofuscus and P. olivaceobrunneus. Tylopilus griseocarneus and T. indecisus are similar.

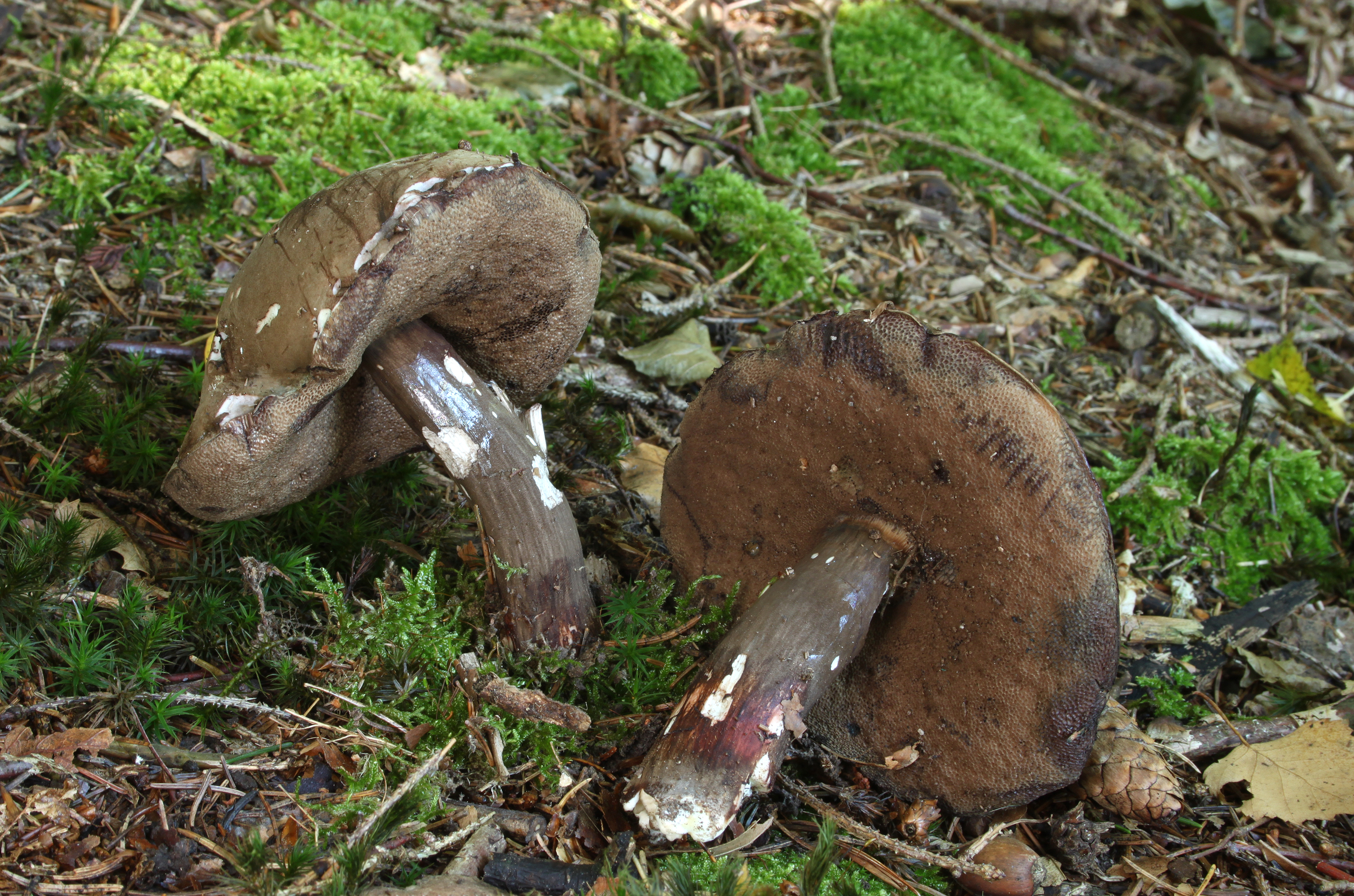
Porphyrellus porphyrosporus

== Distribution and habitat ==
It is a widespread species of Europe, especially in the north, but is nowhere particularly common. It can be found in northern North America.

The fruit bodies appear from late summer to autumn, often in small groups, associated with broad-leaved trees such as beech and oak.

== Edibility ==
One guide lists the species as edible, while another considers it "probably edible".
