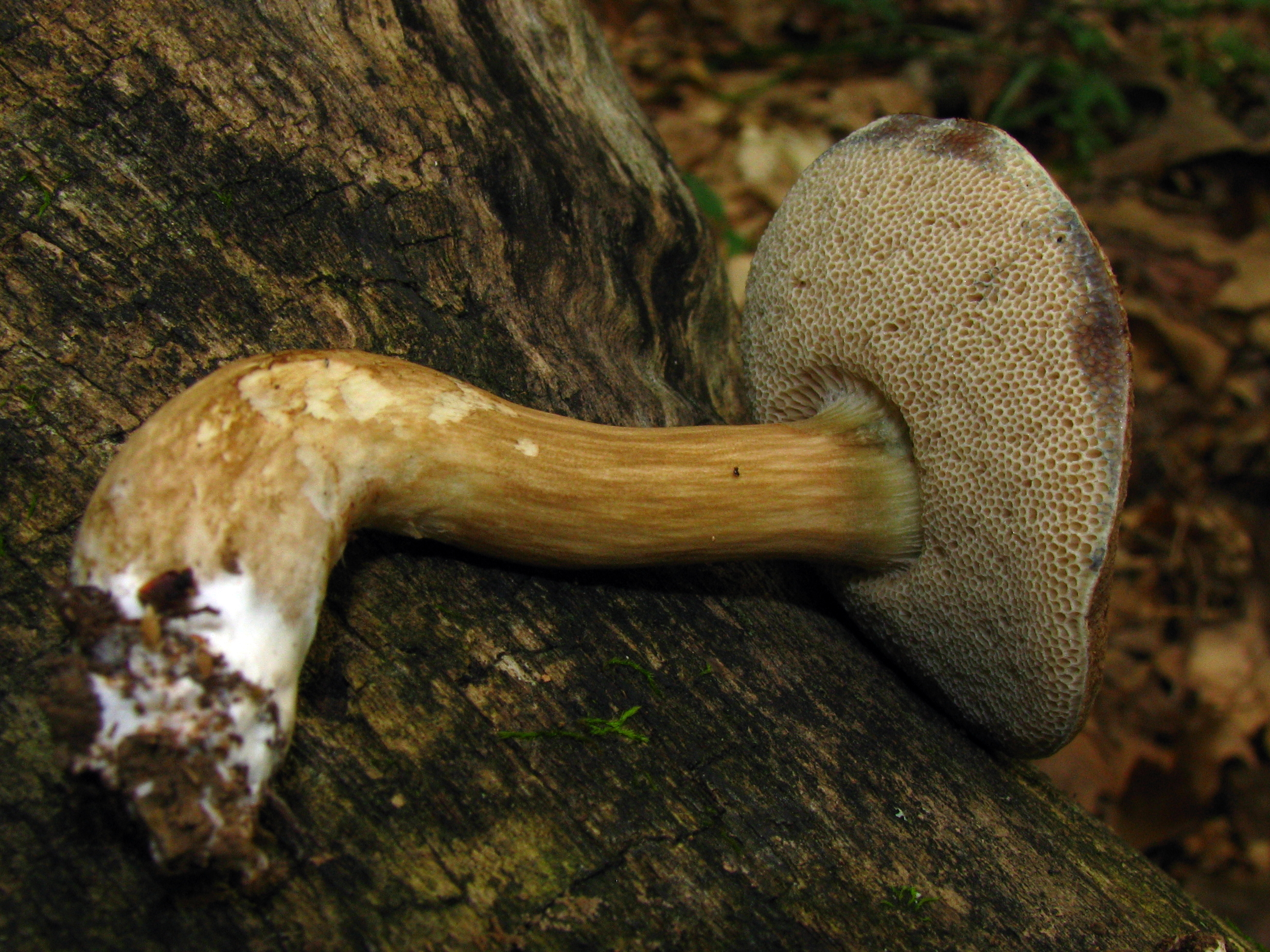

Scientific classification
- Domain: Eukaryota
- Kingdom: Fungi
- Division: Basidiomycota
- Class: Agaricomycetes
- Order: Boletales
- Family: Boletaceae
- Genus: Porphyrellus
- Species: P. sordidus

Binomial name
- Porphyrellus sordidus (Frost) Snell

Synonyms
- List: Boletus sordidus Frost (1874); Ceriomyces sordidus (Frost) Murrill (1909); Suillus sordidus (Frost) Kuntze (1898); Tylopilus sordidus (Frost) A.H.Sm. & Thiers (1968); Tylopilus porphyrosporus var. sordidus (Frost) Wolfe (1980)

= Porphyrellus sordidus =

Species of fungus

Porphyrellus sordidus is a bolete fungus in the family Boletaceae. It was originally described in 1874 by Charles Christopher Frost as a species of Boletus. Fruit bodies of the fungus have a convex to flattened cap measuring 4.5–13 cm (1.8–5.1 in) in diameter. The brownish cap surface is initially tomentose to felt-like, but develops cracks in age. All parts of the mushrooms bruise dark blue to greenish when injured. The spore print is reddish brown; spores are smooth, roughly elliptical, and measure 10–14 by 4–6 μm. The bolete is found in North America, where it grows on the ground under oaks and conifers. Its edibility was recently unknown, but it is now considered inedible.
