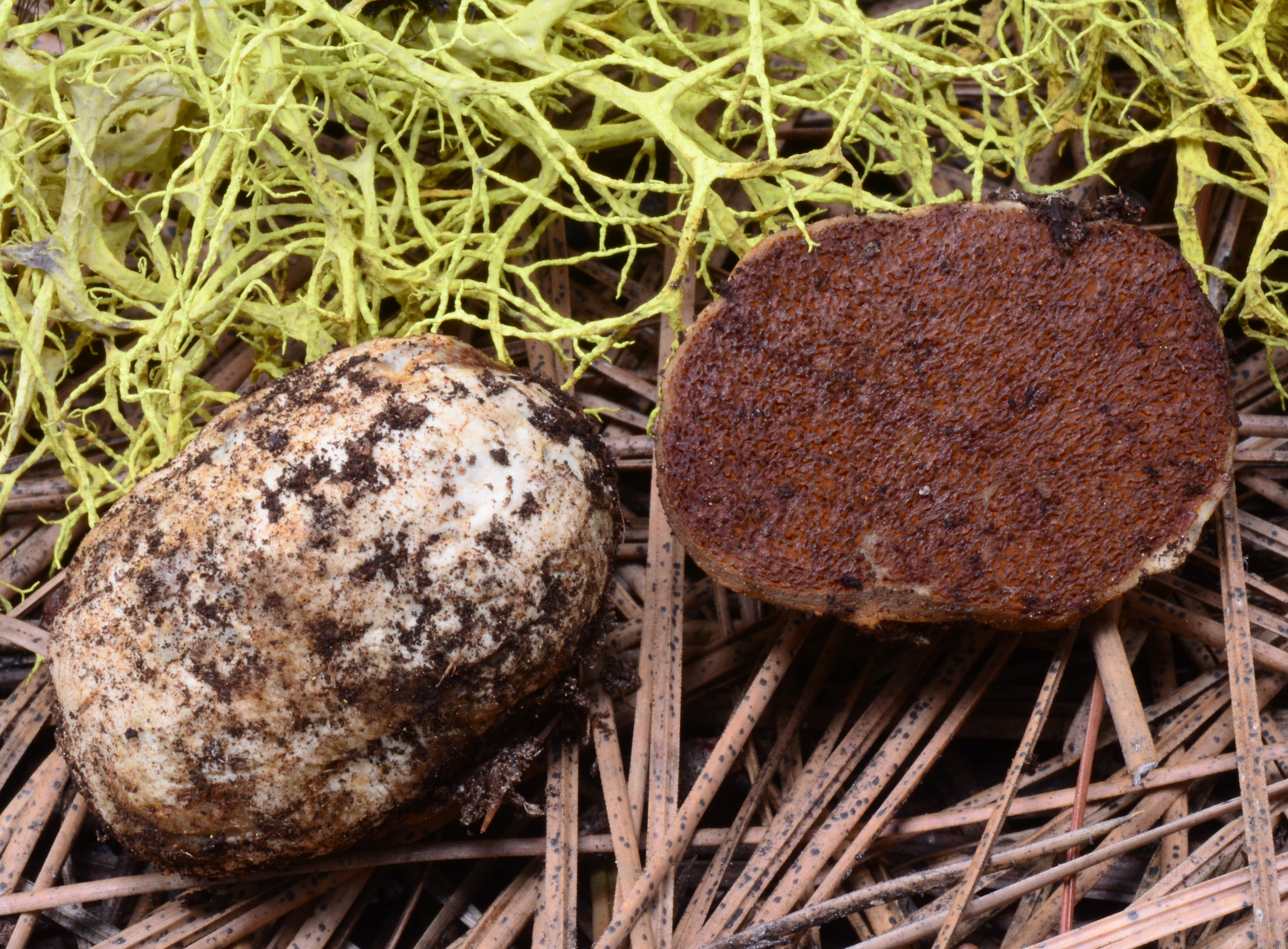
- Hymenogaster sublilacinus

Scientific classification
- Kingdom: Fungi
- Division: Basidiomycota
- Class: Agaricomycetes
- Order: Agaricales
- Family: Hymenogastraceae
- Genus: Hymenogaster; Vittad. (1831)

Type species
- Hymenogaster citrinus Vittad. (1831)

= Hymenogaster =

Genus of fungi

Hymenogaster is a genus of fungi in the family Hymenogastraceae (Agaricales). The genus has a widespread distribution, especially in temperate regions, and contains about 100 species. The taxonomy of the European species was revised in 2011, and twelve species were recognized, for which an identification key was presented. In 2024, seven species were described from China.

== Taxonomy ==
Hymenogaster (Hymenogastraceae, Agaricales) was established by Italian mycologist Carlo Vittadini in 1831, based on eight species found in Europe. It is one of the most species-rich genera of false truffles. Hymenogaster citrinus is the type species.

== Species ==
The following is an incomplete list of species.

- Hymenogaster arenarius
- Hymenogaster citrinus
- Hymenogaster griseus
- Hymenogaster hessei
- Hymenogaster luteus
- Hymenogaster muticus
- Hymenogaster nanus
- Hymenogaster olivaceus
- Hymenogaster parksii
- Hymenogaster rehsteineri
- Hymenogaster subalpinus
- Hymenogaster sulcatus
- Hymenogaster tener
- Hymenogaster thwaitesii
- Hymenogaster vulgaris

These European species were accepted by Stielow et al. in 2011:

- Hymenogaster arenarius
- Hymenogaster bulliardii
- Hymenogaster citrinus
- Hymenogaster griseus
- Hymenogaster huthii
- Hymenogaster intermedius
- Hymenogaster luteus
- Hymenogaster megasporus
- Hymenogaster niveus
- Hymenogaster rehsteineri
- Hymenogaster tener
- Hymenogaster thwaitesii

In 2024, Li and colleagues described seven more species from China, based on morphological and molecular evidence from the internal transcribed spacer.

- Hymenogaster latisporus
- Hymenogaster minisporus
- Hymenogaster papilliformis
- Hymenogaster perisporius
- Hymenogaster pseudoniveus
- Hymenogaster variabilis
- Hymenogaster zunhuaensis
