= Anthoshorea henryana =

Conservation status
- Endangered (IUCN 3.1)

Scientific classification
- Kingdom: Plantae
- Clade: Tracheophytes
- Clade: Angiosperms
- Clade: Eudicots
- Clade: Rosids
- Order: Malvales
- Family: Dipterocarpaceae
- Genus: Anthoshorea
- Species: A. henryana

Binomial name
- Anthoshorea henryana (Pierre ex Laness.) P.S.Ashton & J.Heck. (2022)

Synonyms
- Shorea cambodiana Pierre (1890); Shorea henryana Pierre ex Laness. (1886); Shorea longestipulata Tardieu (1942); Shorea sericeiflora C.E.C.Fisch. & Hutch. (1926)

Species of tree

Anthoshorea henryana (called, along with some other species in the genus Anthoshorea, white meranti) is a species of tree in the family Dipterocarpaceae. It is a tree native to Cambodia, Laos, Peninsular Malaysia, Myanmar, Thailand, and Vietnam.
