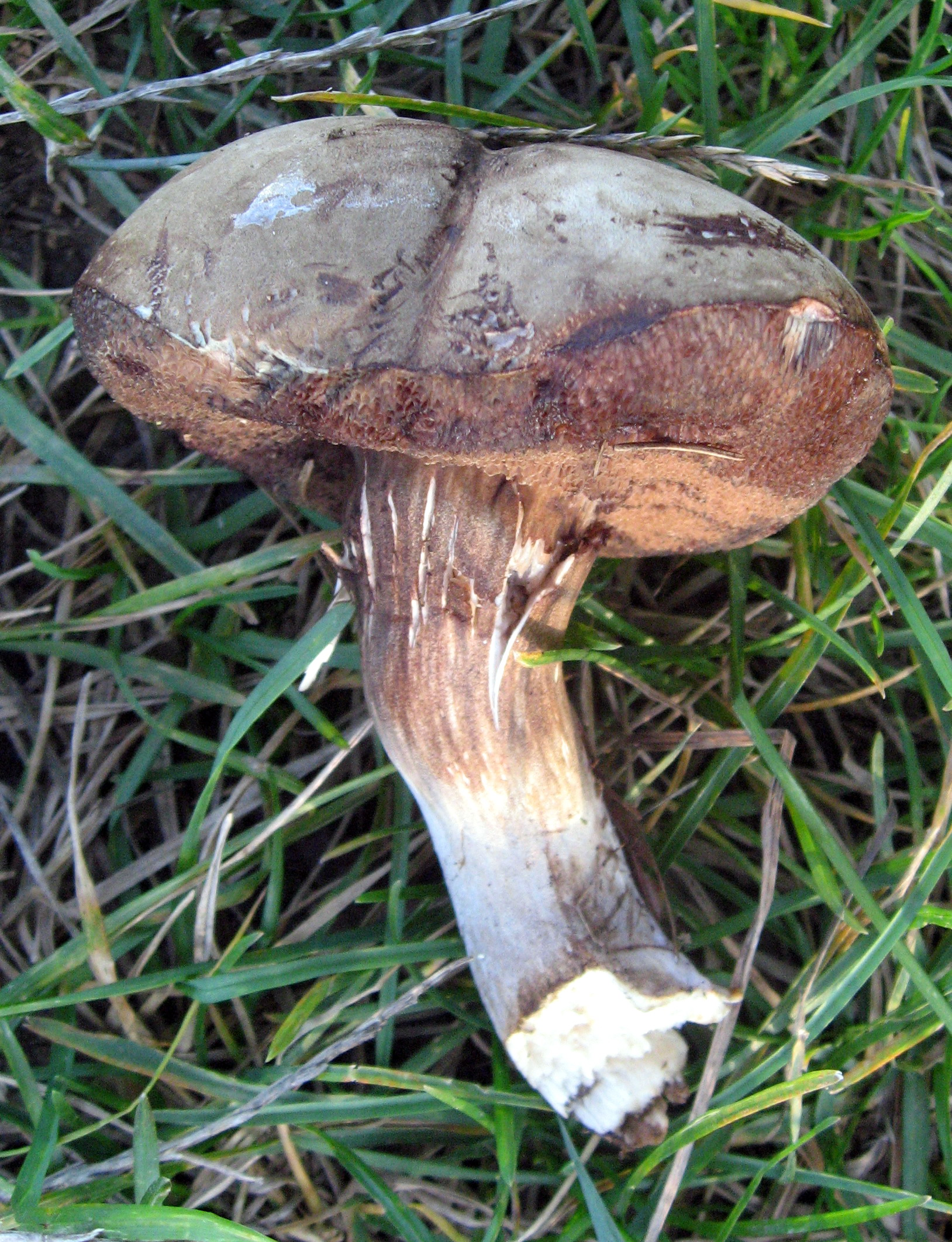
- Porphyrellus porphyrosporus

Scientific classification
- Kingdom: Fungi
- Division: Basidiomycota
- Class: Agaricomycetes
- Order: Boletales
- Family: Boletaceae
- Genus: Porphyrellus; E.-J. Gilbert

Type species
- Porphyrellus porphyrosporus (Fr. & Hök) E.-J. Gilbert

Species
- See text

= Porphyrellus =

Genus of fungi

Porphyrellus is a genus of fungi of the family Boletaceae.

== Species ==
- Porphyrellus alboater
- Porphyrellus alveolatus
- Porphyrellus amylosporus
- Porphyrellus atrafuscus
- Porphyrellus atrobrunneus
- Porphyrellus brunneus
- Porphyrellus cyaneotinctus
- Porphyrellus dictyotus
- Porphyrellus festivus
- Porphyrellus formosanus
- Porphyrellus formosus
- Porphyrellus fuligineus
- Porphyrellus fumosipes
- Porphyrellus fusisporus
- Porphyrellus gracilis
- Porphyrellus heterospermus
- Porphyrellus indecisus
- Porphyrellus longipes
- Porphyrellus malaccensis
- Porphyrellus niger
- Porphyrellus nigrellus
- Porphyrellus nothofagi
- Porphyrellus novae-zelandiae
- Porphyrellus olivaceobrunneus
- Porphyrellus pacificus
- Porphyrellus porphyrosporus
- Porphyrellus rionegrensis
- Porphyrellus sordidus
- Porphyrellus subflavidus
- Porphyrellus subvirens
- Porphyrellus tristis
- Porphyrellus umbrosus
- Porphyrellus venezuelae
- Porphyrellus violaceiporus
- Porphyrellus viscidus
- Porphyrellus zaragozae
