= Dennis E. Desjardin =

American mycologist

Dennis Edmund Desjardin (born May 18, 1950, in Crescent City, California) is an American mycologist. He has been called the "Mushroom Guru of the West Coast".

== Biography ==
Desjardin attended San Jose State University but dropped out to play jazz professionally. A decade later he sought a more stable career. At San Francisco State University (SFSU), he graduated in 1983 with a B.S. in botany and in 1985 with an M.A. in ecology and systematic biology. His M.A. thesis, The marasmioid fungi of California, was supervised by Harry D. Thiers. At the University of Tennessee in Knoxville, Desjardin graduated in 1989 with a Ph.D. in mycology. His Ph.D. thesis, The genus Marasmius from the southern Appalachian Mountains, was supervised by Ronald H. Petersen.

After completing his Ph.D., Desjardin was from 1989 to 1990 an assistant professor at Oberlin College. At San Francisco State University, he was an assistant professor from 1990 to 1993, an associate professor from 1993 to 1997, and a full professor from 1997 until his retirement as professor emeritus. In 1991 he was appointed the director of SFSU's Harry D. Thiers Herbarium. He retired from SFSU in 2021. He became the Chief Mycologist/Advisor for the corporation Sempera Organics.

Desjardin is the author or coauthor of more than 150 scientific publications. His research deals with the ecology and biogeography of fungal species associated with tropical and island habitats, bioluminescent fungi, and fungal systematics. He collaborated with teams of colleagues to elucidate the molecular phylogenetics of porcini mushrooms and species belonging to the agaric family. He is credited as the discoverer or co-discoverer of more than 300 fungal species, including species of luminescent mushrooms. Supported by eight National Science Foundation grants, he has participated in mycology fieldwork in the southeastern and western U.S.A. including the Rocky Mountains, Canada, Mexico, Colombia, Brazil, Switzerland, Java, Bali, Japan, Thailand, Malaysia, Singapore, China, Pohnpei, the Hawaiian Islands, the Philippines, São Tomé, and Príncipe.

He served as an associate editor for Fungal Diversity and Mycologia. He was elected in 1995 a Fellow of the California Academy of Sciences and in 2005 a Fellow of the Mycological Society of America.

Dennis Desjardin married Wipapat Kladwang, Ph.D. They have a son, Spenser L. Desjardin.

== See also ==
- Spongiforma squarepantsii

== Selected publications ==
=== Articles ===
- Wilson, Andrew W.; Desjardin, Dennis E. (2005). "Phylogenetic relationships in the gymnopoid and marasmioid fungi (Basidiomycetes, euagarics clade)". Mycologia. 97 (3): 667–679. doi:10.1080/15572536.2006.11832797. PMID 16392255. S2CID 218589623.
- Matheny, P. Brandon; Curtis, Judd M.; Hofstetter, Valérie; Aime, M. Catherine; Moncalvo, Jean-Marc; Ge, Zai-Wei; Yang, Zhu-Liang; Slot, Jason C.; Ammirati, Joseph F.; Baroni, Timothy J.; Bougher, Neale L.; Hughes, Karen W.; Lodge, D. Jean; Kerrigan, Richard W.; Seidl, Michelle T.; Aanen, Duur K.; Denitis, Matthew; Daniele, Graciela M.; Desjardin, Dennis E.; Kropp, Bradley R.; Norvell, Lorelei L.; Parker, Andrew; Vellinga, Else C.; Vilgalys, Rytas; Hibbett, David S. (2006). "Major clades of Agaricales: A multilocus phylogenetic overview". Mycologia. 98 (6): 982–995. doi:10.1080/15572536.2006.11832627. PMID 17486974. S2CID 4234538.
- Desjardin, Dennis E.; Oliveira, Anderson G.; Stevani, Cassius V. (2008). "Fungi bioluminescence revisited". Photochemical & Photobiological Sciences. 7 (2): 170–182. Bibcode:2008PhPhS...7..170D. doi:10.1039/b713328f. PMID 18264584. S2CID 10637645.
- Desjardin, Dennis E.; Perry, Brian A.; Lodge, D. Jean; Stevani, Cassius V.; Nagasawa, Eiji (2010). "Luminescent Mycena: New and noteworthy species". Mycologia. 102 (2): 459–477. doi:10.3852/09-197. PMID 20361513. S2CID 25377671.
- Desjardin, Dennis E.; Perry, Brian A.; Lodge, D. Jean; Stevani, Cassius V.; Nagasawa, Eiji (2010). "Luminescent Mycena: New and noteworthy species". Mycologia. 102 (2): 459–477. doi:10.3852/09-197. PMID 20361513. S2CID 25377671.
- Zhao, Ruilin; Karunarathna, Samantha; Raspé, Olivier; Parra, Luis A.; Guinberteau, Jacques; Moinard, Magalie; De Kesel, André; Barroso, Gérard; Courtecuisse, Régis; Hyde, Kevin D.; Guelly, Atsu K.; Desjardin, Dennis E.; Callac, Philippe (2011). "Major clades in tropical Agaricus". Fungal Diversity. 51: 279–296. doi:10.1007/s13225-011-0136-7. S2CID 24796986.
- Oliveira, Anderson G.; Desjardin, Dennis E.; Perry, Brian A.; Stevani, Cassius V. (2012). "Evidence that a single bioluminescent system is shared by all known bioluminescent fungal lineages". Photochemical & Photobiological Sciences. 11 (5): 848–852. Bibcode:2012PhPhS..11..848O. doi:10.1039/c2pp25032b. PMID 22495263. S2CID 205831865.
- Chew, Audrey L. C.; Desjardin, Dennis E.; Tan, Yee-Shin; Musa, Md Yusoff; Sabaratnam, Vikineswary (2015). "Bioluminescent fungi from Peninsular Malaysia—a taxonomic and phylogenetic overview". Fungal Diversity. 70: 149–187. doi:10.1007/s13225-014-0302-9. S2CID 256070827.

=== Books ===
- Desjardin, Dennis E.; Wood, Michael G.; Stevens, Frederick A. (12 August 2015). California Mushrooms: The Comprehensive Identification Guide. Timber Press. ISBN 9781604693539.
- Hemmes, Don E.; Desjardin, Dennis E. (23 June 2022). Mushrooms of Hawai'i: An Identification Guide. Echo Point Books & Media, LLC. ISBN 978-1-64837-233-9.
