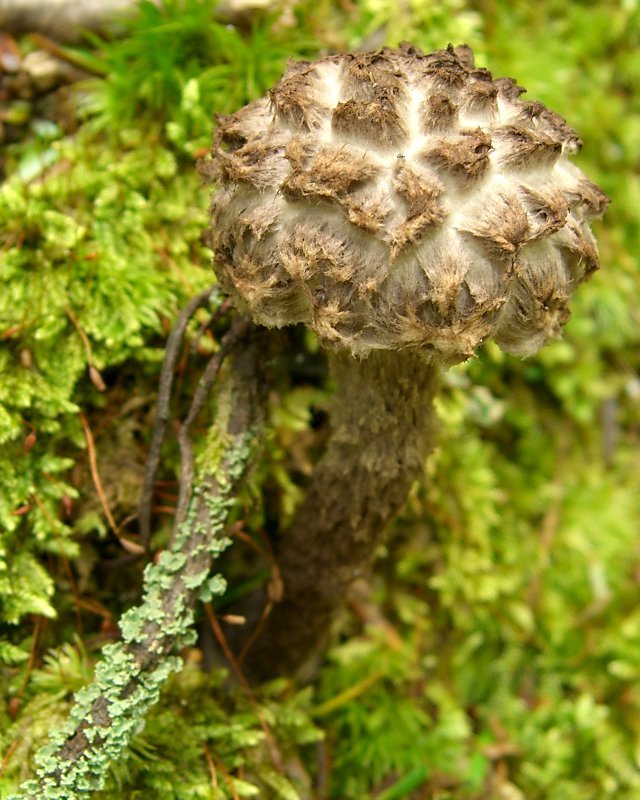
- Strobilomyces strobilaceus

Scientific classification
- Kingdom: Fungi
- Division: Basidiomycota
- Class: Agaricomycetes
- Order: Boletales
- Family: Boletaceae
- Genus: Strobilomyces; Berk. (1851)

Type species
- Strobilomyces strobilaceus (Scop.) Berk. (1851)

Species
- See text

Synonyms
- Eriocorys Quél. (1886)

= Strobilomyces =

Genus of fungi

Strobilomyces is a genus of boletes (mushrooms having a spongy mass of pores under the cap). The only well-known European species is the type species S. strobilaceus (also named S. floccopus), known in English as "old man of the woods".

Members of the genus can be distinguished by the following characteristics:

- the cap and stipe are covered in soft hairy or woolly scales,
- while most boletes have smooth elongated spores, those of Strobilomyces are roughly spherical and prominently ornamented, and
- as might be expected from its "dry" fibrous appearance, it is resistant to decay (whereas most mushrooms in the Boletaceae are soft and decompose notoriously rapidly).

== Taxonomy and classification ==
The genus name comes from the Ancient Greek word Strobilos (στρόβιλος), meaning "pine cone", a reference to the appearance of S. strobilaceus. The ending "-myces" is a standard suffix meaning "mushroom" (Ancient Greek: μύкης). In some older classification systems it is assigned to a separate family Strobilomycetaceae, but more recent phylogenetic evidence merges it into the larger family Boletaceae (suborder Boletineae). These results corroborate older DNA analyses by K. Høiland (1987), which suggested that Strobilomyces is only distantly related to more familiar boletes such as Suillus, but was in fact more closely related to the Earth Balls (Scleroderma).

Many more species have been discovered in warmer countries. The mycologist E. J. H. Corner described several new species from Malaysia including S. foveatus. According to recent estimates, about 40 species are known.

== List of species ==
- Strobilomyces alpinus — Yunnan province, China
- Strobilomyces annulatus — Malaysia
- Strobilomyces areolatus — China
- Strobilomyces atrosquamosus — China
- Strobilomyces benoisii
- Strobilomyces camphoratus
- Strobilomyces coccineus
- Strobilomyces confusus — East Asia, North America (choice edible)
- Strobilomyces dryophilus — (United States)
- Strobilomyces echinatus
- Strobilomyces echinocephalus — China
- Strobilomyces excavatus
- Strobilomyces foveatus — (Malaysia)
- Strobilomyces fusisporus
- Strobilomyces giganteus — Sichuan province, China
- Strobilomyces gilbertianus — Democratic Republic of the Congo
- Strobilomyces glabellus — Yunnan province, China
- Strobilomyces glabriceps — China
- Strobilomyces hongoi — Japan
- Strobilomyces hydriensis
- Strobilomyces latirimosus — Guangxi province, China
- Strobilomyces ligulatus
- Strobilomyces mirandus — Malaysia
- Strobilomyces mollis — Malaysia
- Strobilomyces nigricans — East Asia, North America
- Strobilomyces pallescens
- Strobilomyces parvirimosus — Yunnan province, China
- Strobilomyces polypyramis — Malaysia
- Strobilomyces porphyrius
- Strobilomyces retisporus
- Strobilomyces rufescens
- Strobilomyces sanmingensis — China
- Strobilomyces seminudus — Japan, China
- Strobilomyces strobilaceus = S. floccopus — Asia, North America, Europe
- Strobilomyces subnigricans — Hubei province, China
- Strobilomyces subnudus — Jiangsu province, China
- Strobilomyces velutinus — Yunnan province, China
- Strobilomyces velutipes — Australia, Malaysia
- Strobilomyces verruculosus – Japan
- Strobilomyces zangii — China
