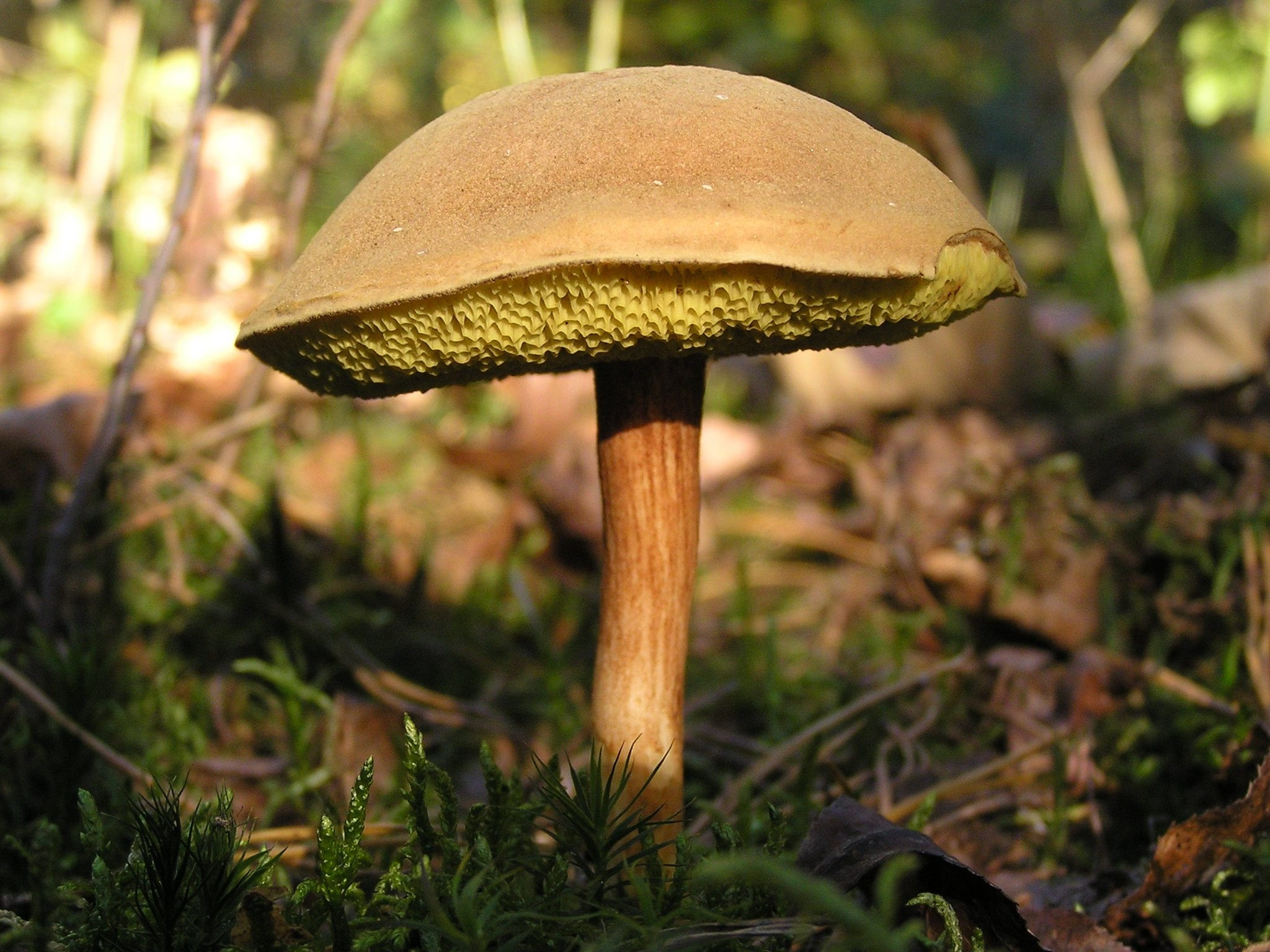
- Xerocomus subtomentosus

Scientific classification
- Kingdom: Fungi
- Division: Basidiomycota
- Class: Agaricomycetes
- Order: Boletales
- Family: Boletaceae
- Genus: Xerocomus; Quél. (1887)

Type species
- Xerocomus subtomentosus (L.) Quél. (1888)

= Xerocomus =

Genus of fungi

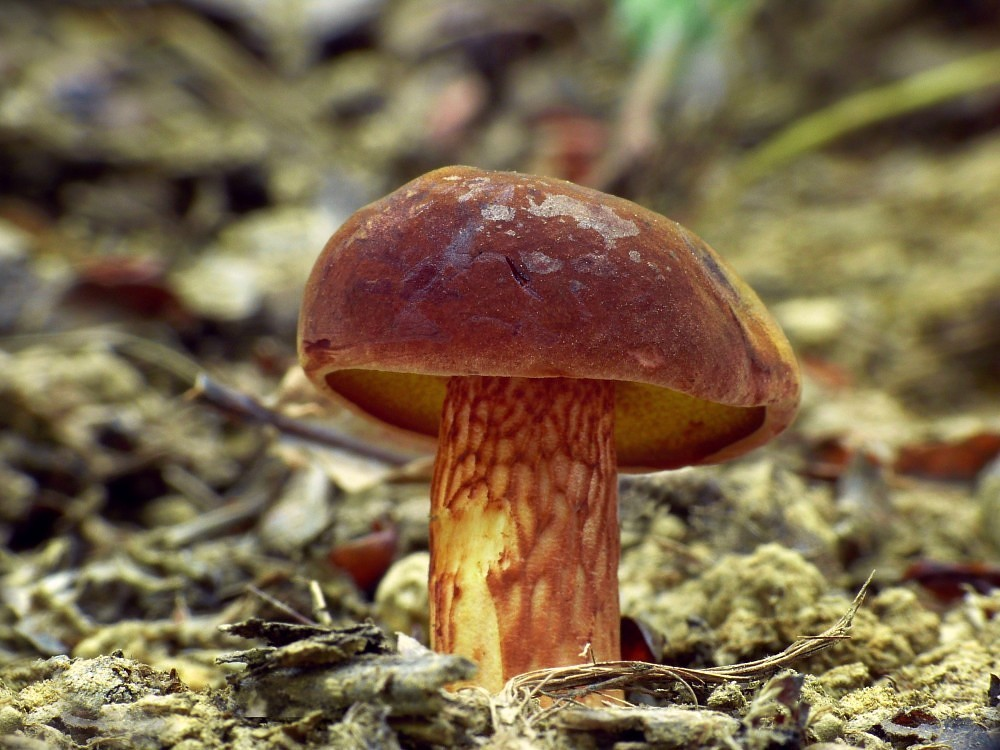
Xerocomus silwoodensis

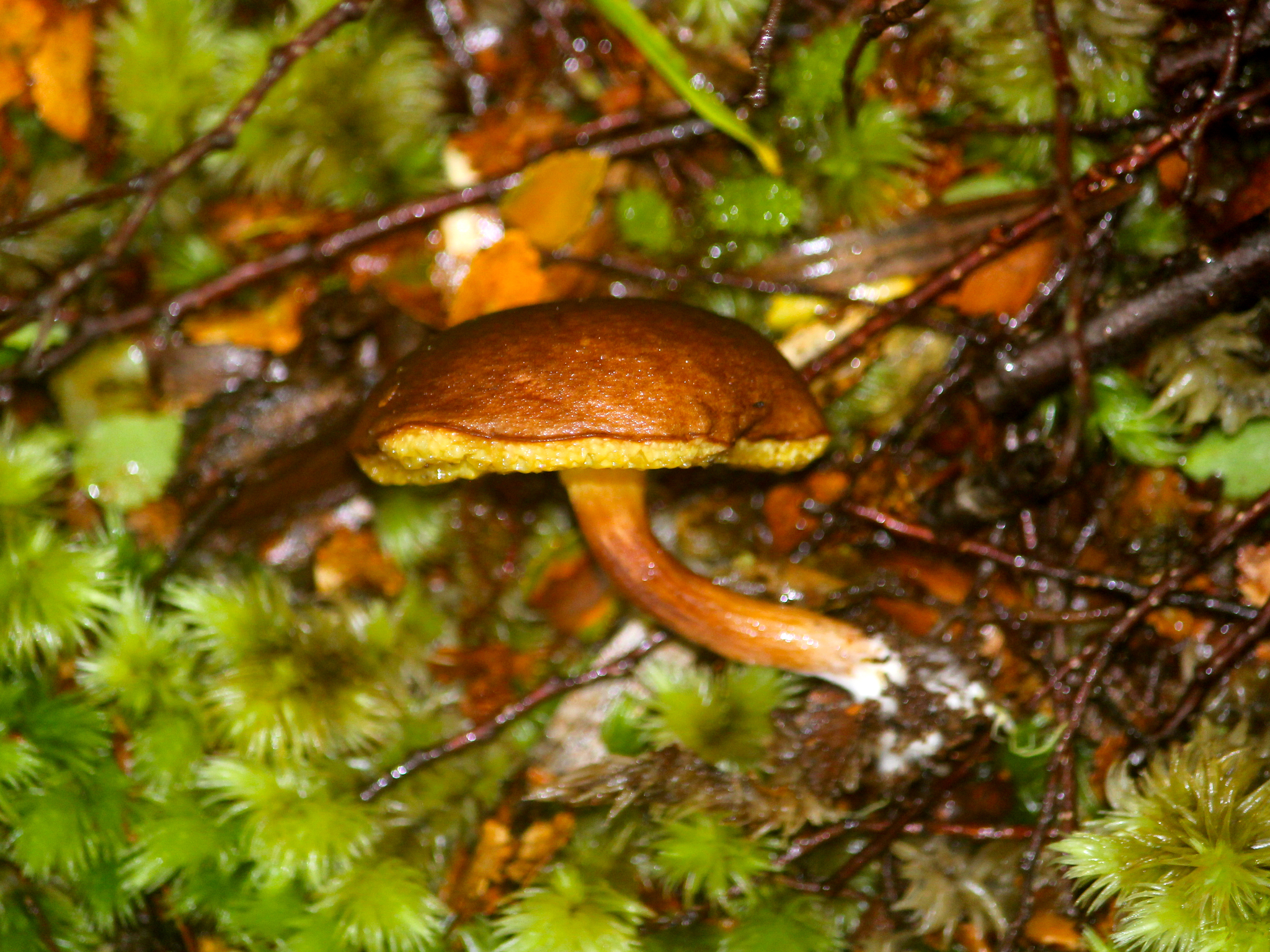
Xerocomus squamulosus

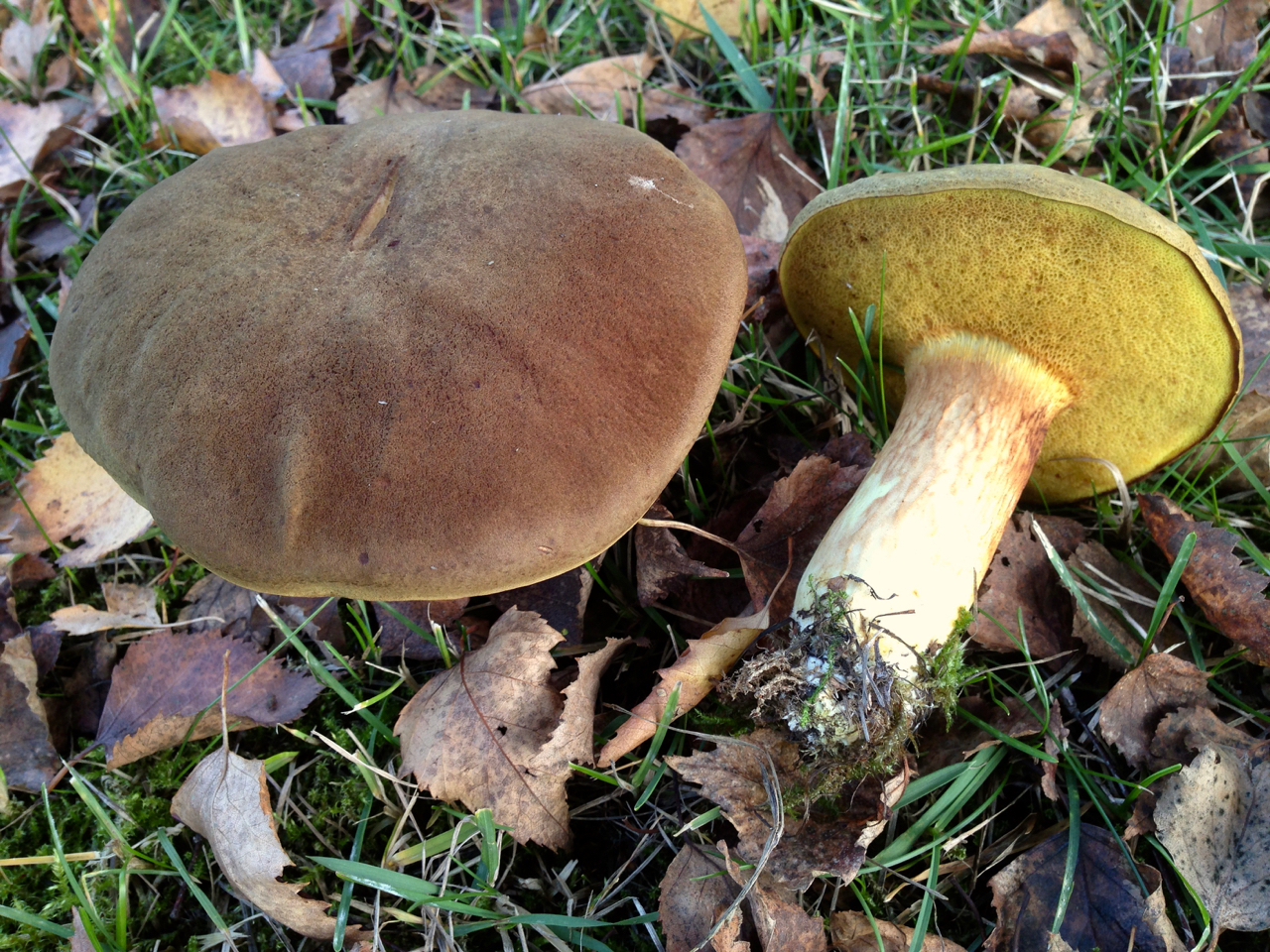
Xerocomus ferrugineus

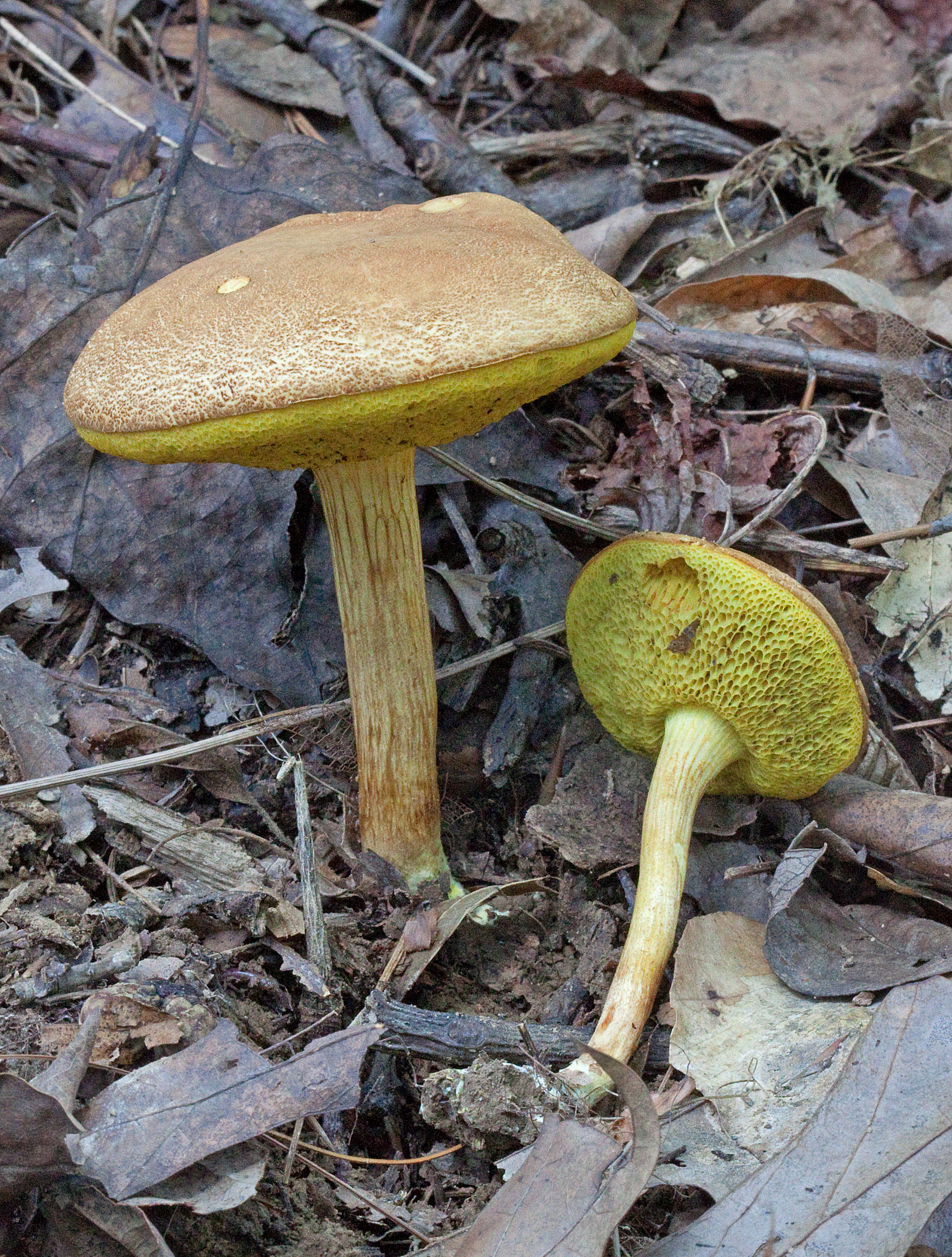
Xerocomus illudens

Xerocomus is a genus of poroid fungi related to Boletus. Most members of Xerocomus are edible, though of mediocre gastronomical value and inferior to the sought-after porcini.

== Taxonomy ==
Many mycologists did not originally recognize the distinction between the two genera and placed Xerocomus taxa in genus Boletus. However, several molecular phylogenetic studies have demonstrated that Xerocomus is a heterogeneous genus of polyphyletic origin, which has resulted in further division of Xerocomus into Xerocomellus and Hemileccinum. The members of the genus Xerocomellus are more closely related to Boletus than true Xerocomus is, which is relatively distantly related to Boletus and more closely related to Phylloporus. Other former Xerocomus species have since been moved to Aureoboletus, Imleria, Hortiboletus and Rheubarbariboletus.

Ladurner and Simonini published a monograph on Xerocomus in 2003, but this predated the taxonomical revisions based on phylogenetic inferences. In 2008, Hills included 18 species found in Britain, not including some species sometimes treated as Xerocomus, and including Boletus pulverulentus and Boletus impolitus., currently placed in genera Cyanoboletus and Hemileccinum, respectively. More recent phylogenies have confirmed Xerocomus as monophyletic in its new restricted arrangement.

== Description ==
Morphological features of xerocomoid boletes
	Boletus s.str.	Hemileccinum	Xerocomellus	Xerocomus s.str.
Spore surface	Smooth	Smooth	Longitudinally striated or smooth, never bacillate	Bacillate
Hymenophoral trama	Boletoid type with gelatinous lateral strata	Boletoid type with gelatinous lateral strata	Intermediate between boletoid and phylloporoid when fully developed with distinct but weakly gelatinous lateral strata	Phylloporoid type with nongelatinous lateral strata
Pileipellis	Trichoderm, sometimes collapsing, rarely ixotrichoderm or other	Initially trichoderm but collapses with age	Initially palisadoderm, typically encrusted	Initially a trichoderm, never encrusted
Lateral stipe stratum	Frequently gelatinous, 60-90 μM thick, thicker than that of Xerocomellus	Similar to that of Leccinum species, ornamented with stipe scabrousities up to 400-640 μM thick	Frequently not present, reduced to no more than 30-40 μM thick, not gelatinous	Lateral stipe stratum never gelatinous and 80-200 μM thick

== Species ==
- X. albobrunneus Heinem. & Gooss.-Font. 1951
- X. albotessellatus Heinem. 1964
- X. alliaceus (Beeli) Heinem. 1951
- X. amazonicus Singer 1978
- X. anthracinus M.Zang, M.R.Hu & W.P.Liu 1991
- X. astereicola Imazeki 1952
- X. astraeicolopsis J.Z.Ying & M.Q.Wang 1981
- X. belizensis — Belize
- X. chrysonemus
- X. cyaneibrunnescens — Guyana
- X. ferrugineus
- X. garhwalensis Nautiyal et al. 2025 — NW India
- X. griseo-olivaceus — New Zealand
- X. guidonis
- X. illudens — North America, India and Bangladesh
- X. lentistipitatus — New Zealand
- X. mcrobbii — New Zealand
- X. nothofagi — New Zealand
- X. olivaceus — Belize
- X. parvogracilis — Guyana
- X. porophyllus — China
- X. potaroensis — Guyana
- X. rishikeshinus Nautiyal et al. 2025 — NW India
- X. rufostipitatus — New Zealand
- X. silwoodensis (discovered on a university campus in London, named 7th top new species of 2007 by IISE)
- X. squamulosus — New Zealand
- X. subtomentosus (edible and very common, found in Eurasia, North America and Australia)
- X. tenax
