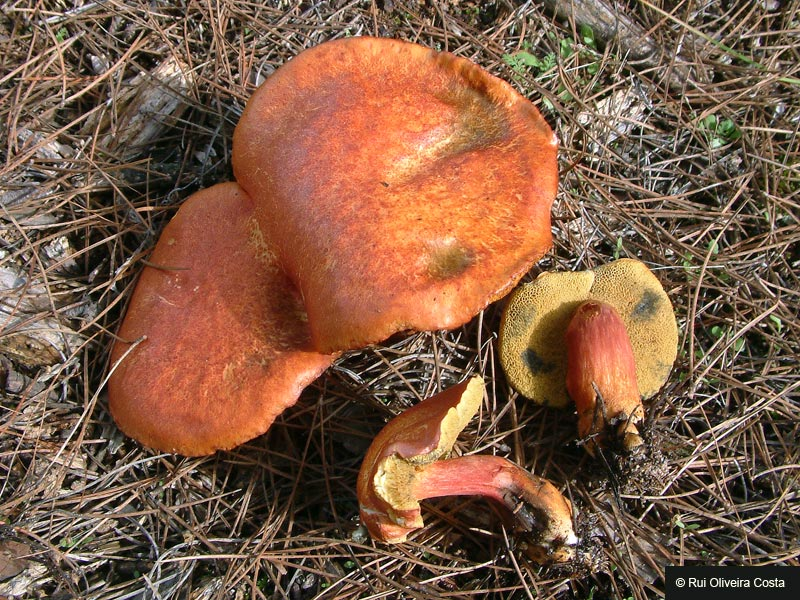

Scientific classification
- Kingdom: Fungi
- Division: Basidiomycota
- Class: Agaricomycetes
- Order: Boletales
- Family: Boletaceae
- Genus: Rheubarbariboletus
- Species: R. armeniacus

Binomial name
- Rheubarbariboletus armeniacus (Quél.) Vizzini, Simonini & Gelardi (2015)

Synonyms
- Boletus armeniacus Quél. (1885); Xerocomus armeniacus (Quél.) Quél. (1888); Xerocomellus armeniacus (Quél.) Šutara (2008)

= Rheubarbariboletus armeniacus =

Species of fungus

Rheubarbariboletus armeniacus is a small mushroom in the family Boletaceae native to Europe. It was formerly placed in the genera Boletus, Xerocomus, and Xerocomellus. It acquired its current name when it was transferred to genus Rheubarbariboletus in 2015.

== Taxonomy ==
French naturalist Lucien Quélet described this species as Boletus armeniacus in 1885, before placing it in the genus Xerocomus in his 1888 work Flore mycologique de la France et des pays limitrophes (Mycological flora of France and neighbouring countries).

It was transferred to the new genus Xerocomellus described by Czech mycologist Josef Šutara in 2008, and then to Rheubarbariboletus in 2015.

== Description ==
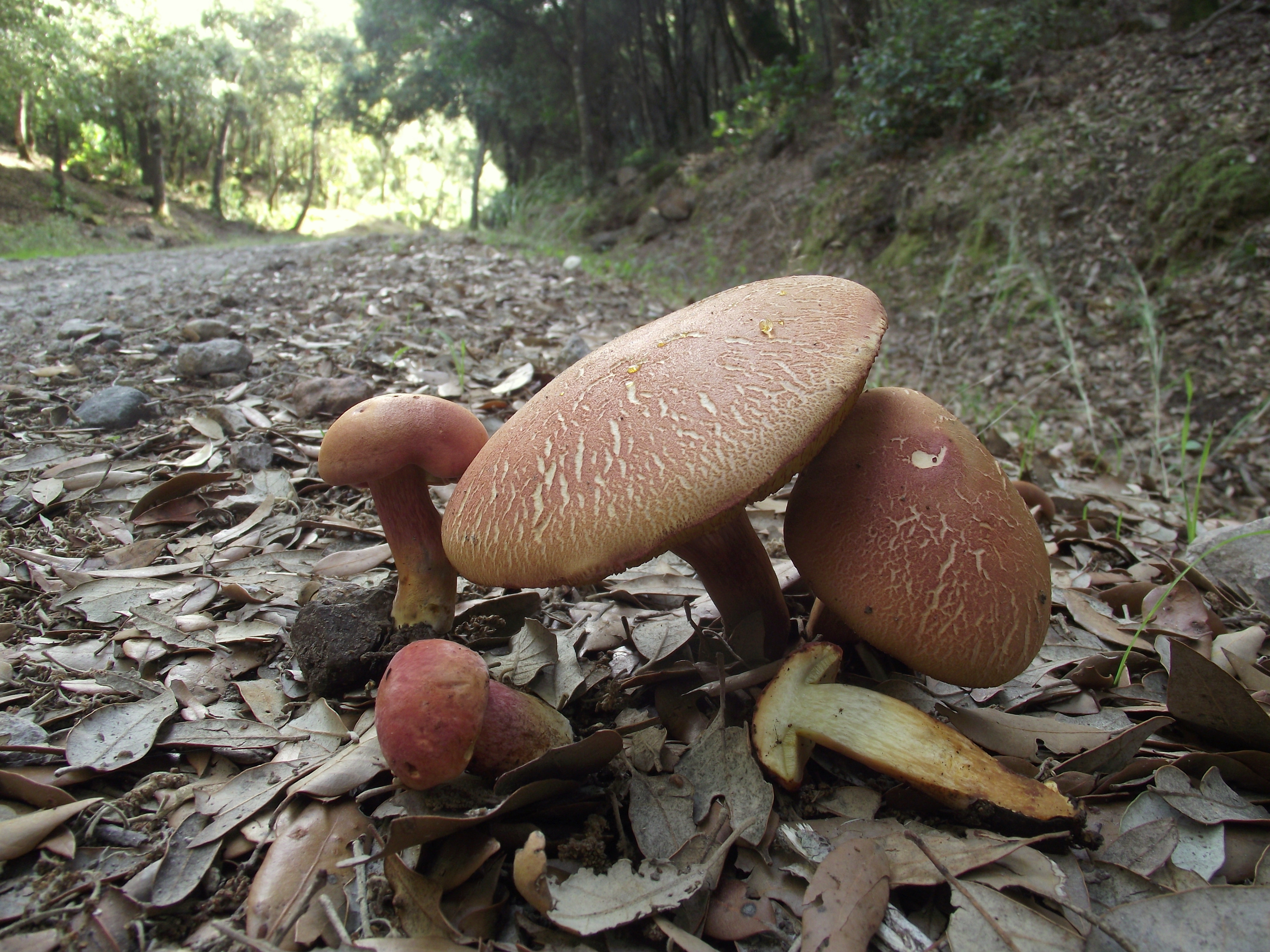
Fruiting in Monte Arci, Sardinia, Italy

The cap is initially globular before expanding to become convex and flattening somewhat; it grows to a diameter of 2–6 cm (3/4–2 3/8 in). The cap margin initially adheres to the stipe and has a tendency to become lobed or undulated in age. The cap surface is first somewhat pubescent but later becomes smooth and hairless, and may develop cracks in age. Its color is orangish-apricot, aging to ochre. Tubes are initially pale yellow, but become more vivid in age, and eventually develop greenish-yellow to greenish-olive tones. They will become pale blue upon with bruising. The pores are circular or a bit angular, with the same coloring and bruising reaction as the tubes. The robust stipe measures 3–8 cm (1 1/8–3 1/8 in) long by 0.5–1.5 cm (1/4–5/8 in) thick. It is usually thicker in the middle or lower region, and its base roots into the substrate. The top part of the stipe is yellow; under this the coloration tends to be masked by a dense and fine reticulation that becomes brown to brownish-crimson in age. In some specimens the stipe cuticle cracks and pointed patches lift from the surface. The flesh is pale yellow in the cap, with a narrow strip of pinkish-yellow under the cuticle; in the stipe, the flesh is orange-ochre, with a reddish tint. The flesh sometimes shows a slight and temporary color change to blue when cut or otherwise injured, but this feature is not consistent. It has a pleasant odor and a fruity-acid taste. The base of the stem has a green-blue reaction with iron salts (FeSO_{4}).

Spores are fusiform (spindle shaped), measuring 10–15 by 4.5–6 μm. The basidia (spore-bearing cells) are club-shaped, four-spored, and contain internal oil droplets; they measure 28–35 by 9–12 μm. The cystidia are fusiform, hyaline (translucent), and 40–55 by 9–12 μm.

== Ecology ==
It has been recorded forming ectomycorrhizal association with white poplar (Populus alba) in Hungary. Its ectomycorrhizae contain bright yellow pigments, especially the rhizomorphs, and have warts on the outer surfaces of both the rhizomorphs and the mantle. The ectomycorrhizae of R. armeniacus cannot be reliably distinguished from those of Xerocomus subtomentosus.
