= Cyanoboletus sinopulverulentus =

Scientific classification
- Domain: Eukaryota
- Kingdom: Fungi
- Division: Basidiomycota
- Class: Agaricomycetes
- Order: Boletales
- Family: Boletaceae
- Genus: Cyanoboletus
- Species: C. sinopulverulentus

Binomial name
- Cyanoboletus sinopulverulentus (Gelardi & Vizzini) Gelardi, Vizzini & Simonini (2014)

Synonyms
- Boletus sinopulverulentus Gelardi & Vizzini (2013)

Species of fungus

Cyanoboletus sinopulverulentus is a species of bolete fungus in the family Boletaceae. Described as new to science in 2013, it is found in Shaanxi Province, central China. It is a member of the Cyanoboletus pulverulentus species complex. It was originally named as a species of Boletus in 2013 before being transferred to Cyanoboletus in 2014.
