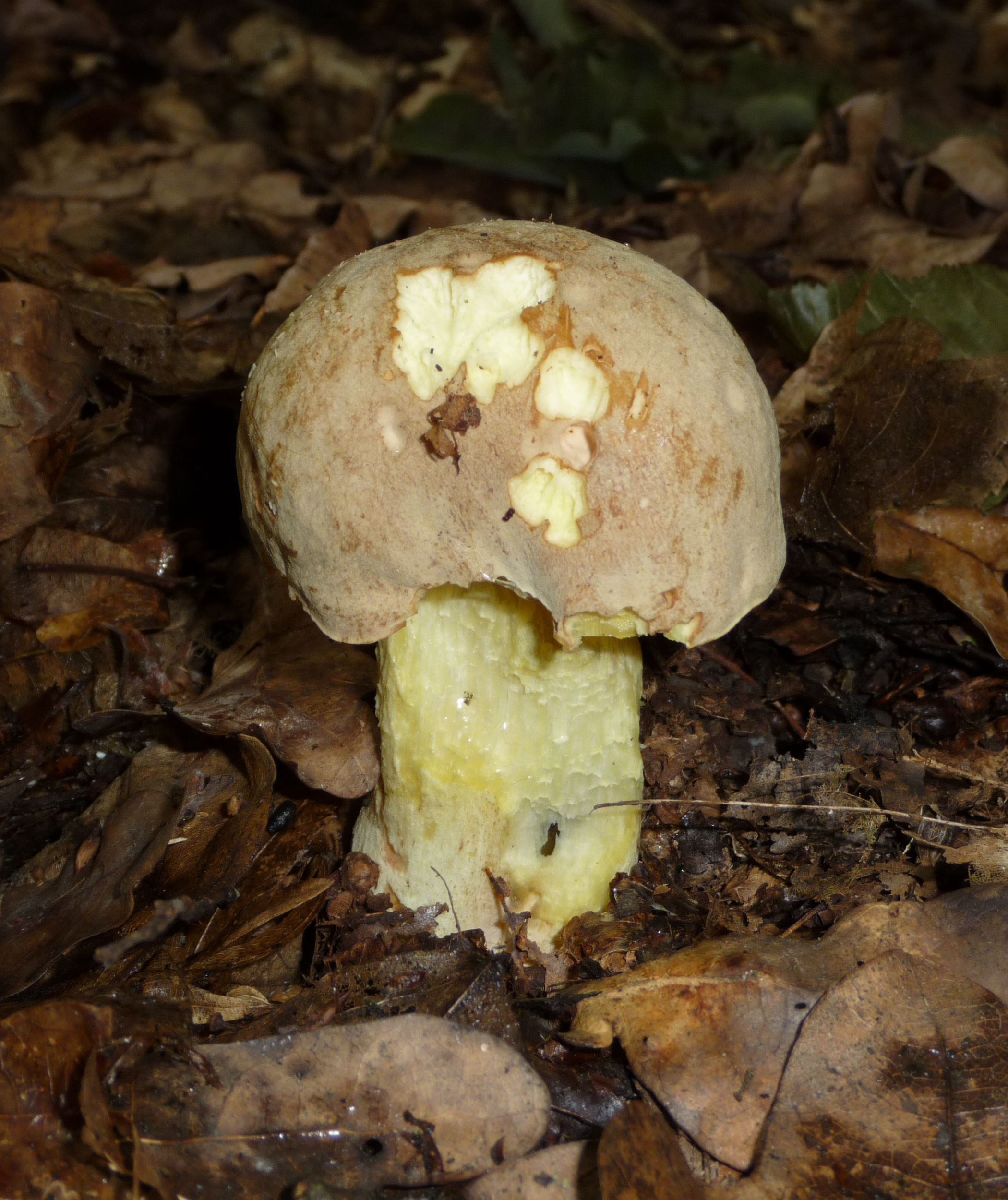

Scientific classification
- Domain: Eukaryota
- Kingdom: Fungi
- Division: Basidiomycota
- Class: Agaricomycetes
- Order: Boletales
- Family: Boletaceae
- Genus: Hemileccinum
- Species: H. impolitum

Binomial name
- Hemileccinum impolitum (Fr.) Šutara (2008)

Synonyms
- Boletus impolitus Fr. (1838); Xerocomus impolitus (Fr.) Quél. (1888); Leccinum impolitum (Fr.) Bertault (1980); Tubiporus impolitus (Fr.) Karst. (1882); Versipellis impolita (Fr.) Quél. (1886); Versipellis fragrans var. impolita (Fr.) Quél. (1886)

= Hemileccinum impolitum =

Hemileccinum impolitum Mycological characteristics
- Pores on hymenium
- Cap is convex or flat
- Stipe is bare
- Spore print is olive-brown
- Ecology is mycorrhizal
- Edibility is edible

Hemileccinum impolitum is a basidiomycete fungus of the family Boletaceae, native to Europe. It is commonly referred to as the iodine bolete, because its fruit bodies tend to emit an iodine-like odour when cut, more detectable in the stem base or overripe specimens.

Like other members of the family, H. impolitum has tubes and pores instead of gills in the hymenial surface of its fruit bodies. It is widely distributed in temperate and southern Europe, where it grows in mycorrhizal symbiosis with broad-leaved trees, particularly oak (Quercus).

== Taxonomy and phylogeny ==
The iodine bolete was first described by Elias Magnus Fries, an eminent mycologist of the 19th century, who placed the fungus in genus Boletus. The Latin epithet impolitum (meaning "rough"), likely refers to the cap of the species, which is initially felty and covered in a finely filamentous coating when viewed under a magnifying glass. The species' taxonomic position had long remained uncertain and various authors had placed it in different genera in the past, including the now abandoned genera Tubiporus and Versipellis.

Based on preliminary analysis of the 28S ribosomal RNA locus, mycologists Manfred Binder and Halmut Besl placed the species in Xerocomus in 2000. However, in 2008 Josef Šutara transferred the fungus to the new genus Hemileccinum, based on its distinctive morphology. More elaborate phylogenetic studies by Wu and colleagues in 2014, confirmed that the iodine bolete does not belong in Boletus, Xerocomus or Leccinum, since collections identified as this species occupied a distinct phylogenetic lineage within the subfamily of Xerocomoideae, closely related to Corneroboletus. Subsequent contributions by R. Halling and colleagues, and M. Loizides and colleagues, have since confirmed the monophyly of the genus, which presently includes just two European species: H. impolitum and H. depilatum.

== Description ==
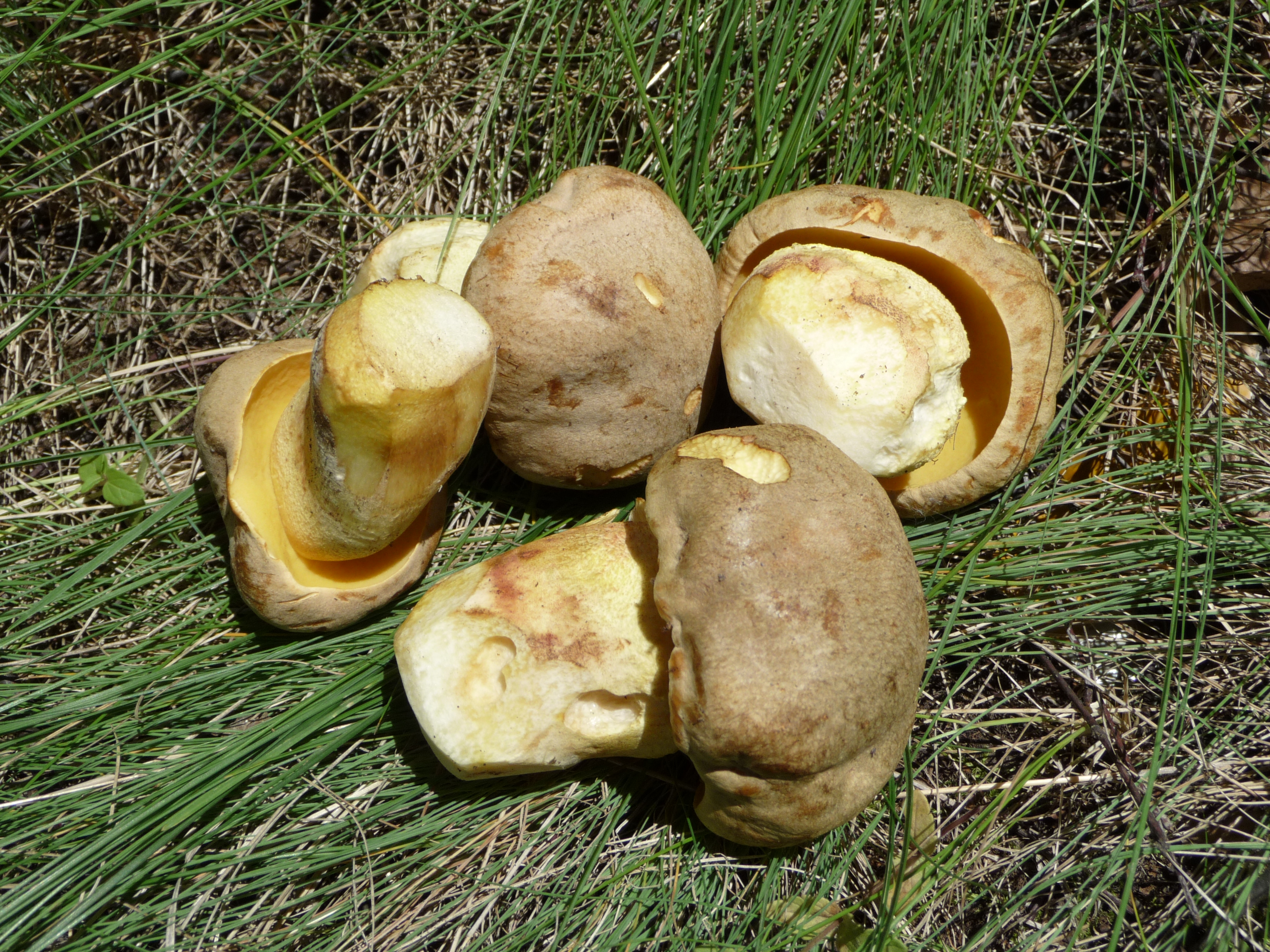
Iodine Bolete found in Ukraine

The cap diameter usually ranges between 5 and 12 cm (2 and 4.5 in), but can reach 20 cm (8 in). It is at first hemispherical, gradually becoming convex as the fungus expands and finally flat in fully mature specimens, sometimes with a slightly uplifted margin. The colour ranges from light tan, pale brown, chestnut-brown, grey, ochraceous-brown, greyish-brown or olivaceous-brown and the cap of young fruit bodies is initially covered in a velvety, finely filamentous silvery-grey coating that disappears in age.

The cap cuticle turns violet with a drop of ammonium hydroxide.

The stem is cylindrical, clavate or ventricose, 5 to 15 cm (2 to 6 in) high by 2 to 6 cm (1 to 2.5 in) wide, cream to pale yellow, but typically lemon-yellow at the apex and usually narrowing at the base. It has no reticulation (net), but is covered in tiny pustules (scabrosities) below the apex, sometimes browning with age.

The tubes are pale yellow to lemon-yellow and usually do not discolour when cut, but may rarely stain faintly greenish-brown. The pores are small and rounded, lemon-yellow to chrome-yellow, not discolouring or rarely staining greenish-brown where handled or injured. The flesh is thick, soft, pale yellow to whitish, usually remaining the same colour when cut, or rarely becoming faintly pinkish-brown above the tubes and at the stem base. It has a sour smell somewhat reminiscent of iodine, more pronounced at the stem base.

The spore print is olivaceous-brown.

The spores are fusiform (spindle-shaped) or fusiform-ellipsoid, measuring 10–16 × 4–6 μm. Although under an optical microscope they appear perfectly smooth, when viewed with a scanning electron microscope (SEM) fine warts and tiny “pin-pricks” are visible on their surface. The cap cuticle is a trichodermium, composed of cylindrical smooth hyphae with clavate terminal cells that later collapse in mature specimens.

=== Similar species ===
- Hemileccinum depilatum is the sister-species of H. impolitum and morphologically very similar, differing by its wrinkled or "hammered" cap surface, and its association hornbeam (Carpinus) or hop-hornbeam (Ostrya). Microscopically it is distinguished by the structure of its cap cuticle, which is a palisadoderm composed of spherical and shortly cylindrical cells.
- Leccinellum lepidum can also look very similar, but typically has a viscid cap with a wrinkled or "hammered" surface not turning violet with a drop of aqueous ammonia, while its flesh slowly turns violaceous-grey and finally greyish-black when exposed to the air. Microscopically it has longer spores, often reaching 20 μm in length.
- Xerocomus subtomentosus lacks scabrosities on the stem surface, while its pores are larger, angular and stain bluish when bruised. When longitudinally cut, its flesh is pinkish-brown in the lower part of the stem and sometimes discolours faintly bluish in the cap.

== Distribution and habitat ==
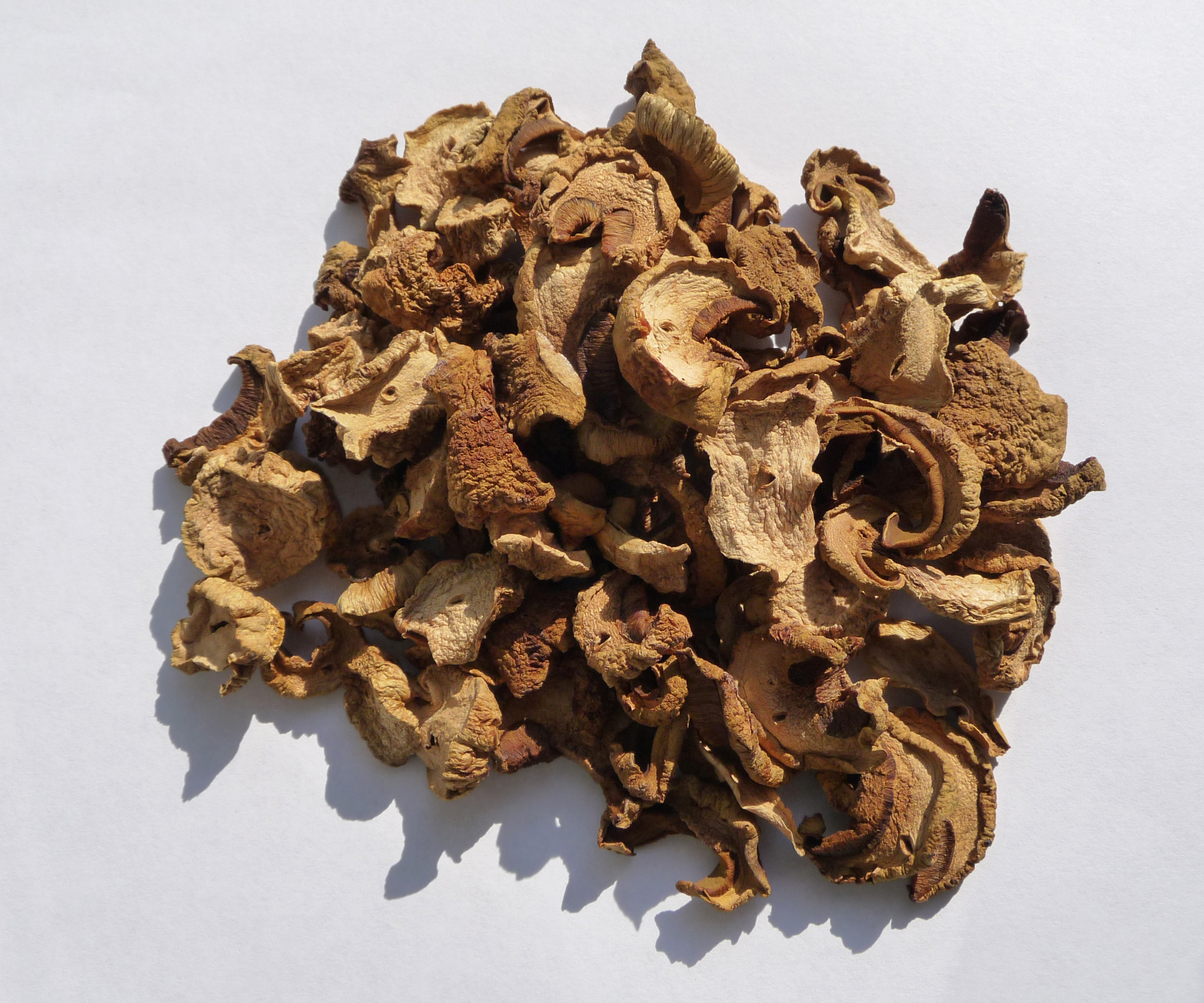
Dried Hemileccinum impolitum

Hemileccinum impolitum is ecologically versatile, forming ectomycorrhizal associations with several species of oak (Quercus), but occasionally also with beech (Fagus) and chestnut (Castanea). It does not appear to be substrate-specific and has been reported from both calcareous and acidic soil. In the United Kingdom, it is occasionally found in southern England, although finds in other parts of the country have also been reported.

Molecular phylogenetic testing has so far verified its presence in Estonia, France, Germany, Portugal, Spain, Sweden, and the Mediterranean islands of Cyprus and Sardinia.

== Edibility ==
The iodine bolete is described as edible by some authors, and inedible by others, probably because of the peculiar odour of this species. However, it is hardly ever found in large numbers, therefore care and discretion should be exercised when intending to eat this mushroom.
