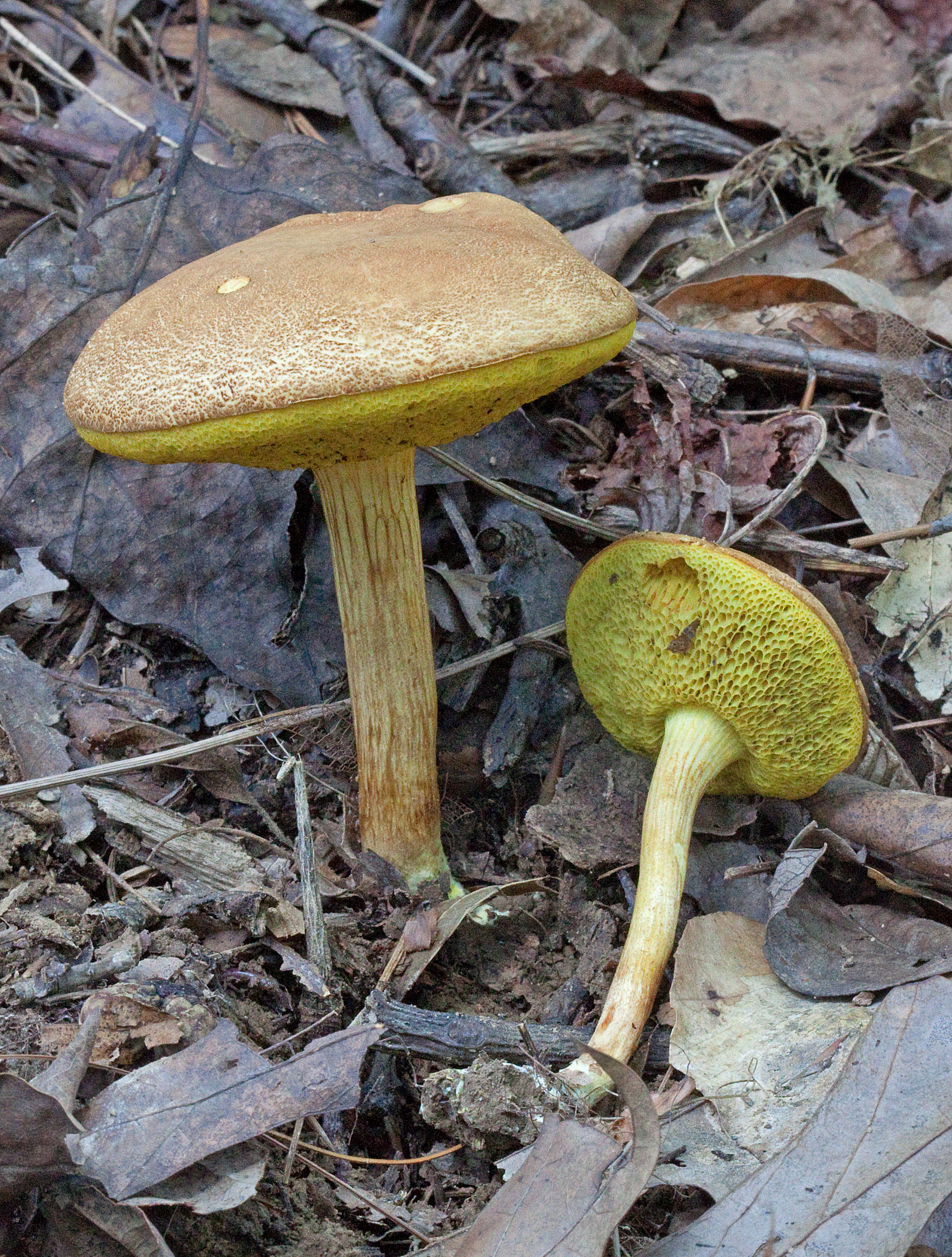

Scientific classification
- Kingdom: Fungi
- Division: Basidiomycota
- Class: Agaricomycetes
- Order: Boletales
- Family: Boletaceae
- Genus: Xerocomus
- Species: X. illudens

Binomial name
- Xerocomus illudens (Peck) Singer

Synonyms
- Boletus illudens Peck (1898)

= Xerocomus illudens =

Species of fungus

Xerocomus illudens is a species of bolete fungus in the family Boletaceae. Described as new to science in 1898, it is found in Asia and North America, where it grows in a mycorrhizal association with oak.

== Taxonomy ==
The species was first described scientifically by Charles Horton Peck in 1898. Rolf Singer transferred it to the genus Xerocomus in 1946. Although some mycologists prefer to maintain Xerocomus as a separate genus, taxonomic authorities usually lump Xerocomus into Boletus. However, recent studies have supported the splintering of Boletus into several genera and recognition of a core Xerocomus group using multi-loci analysis.

== Description ==
The cap is initially convex before flattening out in maturity, and attains a diameter of 3–9 cm (1.2–3.5 in). The cap surface is dry, with a velvety to slightly hairy texture. The color in young specimens is pale brownish-yellow, changing gradually to yellow-brown or pinkish in maturity. The flesh is pale yellow, has no distinctive taste or odor, and, unlike many bolete species, does not turn blue when cut or injured. The pore surface on the underside of the cap is lemon yellow, and pores number about 1–2 per millimeter (sometimes more in older individuals). The tubes comprising the hymenophore are 0.8–1.6 cm (0.3–0.6 in) deep. The stem is 3–9 cm (1.2–3.5 in) long by 0.5–1.3 cm (0.2–0.5 in) thick, tapering somewhat near the base. It is solid (i.e., not hollow), dry, yellow, and marked by longitudinal grooves that form a partial reticulum (network-like surface).

Xerocomus illudens produces an olive to olive-brown spore print. The spores are elliptical to spindle-shaped, smooth, and measure 10–14 by 4–5 μm. Fruit bodies are edible. They can be used in mushroom dyeing, and produce colors such as beige (with yellow, green, or gray tints), or light gold, depending on the mordant used.

== Habitat and distribution ==
Xerocomus illudens is a mycorrhizal fungus, and forms mutually beneficial associations with oak. Its fruit bodies grow singly, scattered, or in groups on the ground, in forests of oak or oak-pine. Fruiting occurs from July to October. In North America, its distribution extends from eastern Canada south to South Carolina, and west to Alabama and Minnesota. It has also been recorded in India, from Ramna Forest in the Burdwan District of West Bengal, and in the Himalayas.

== See also ==
- List of North American boletes
