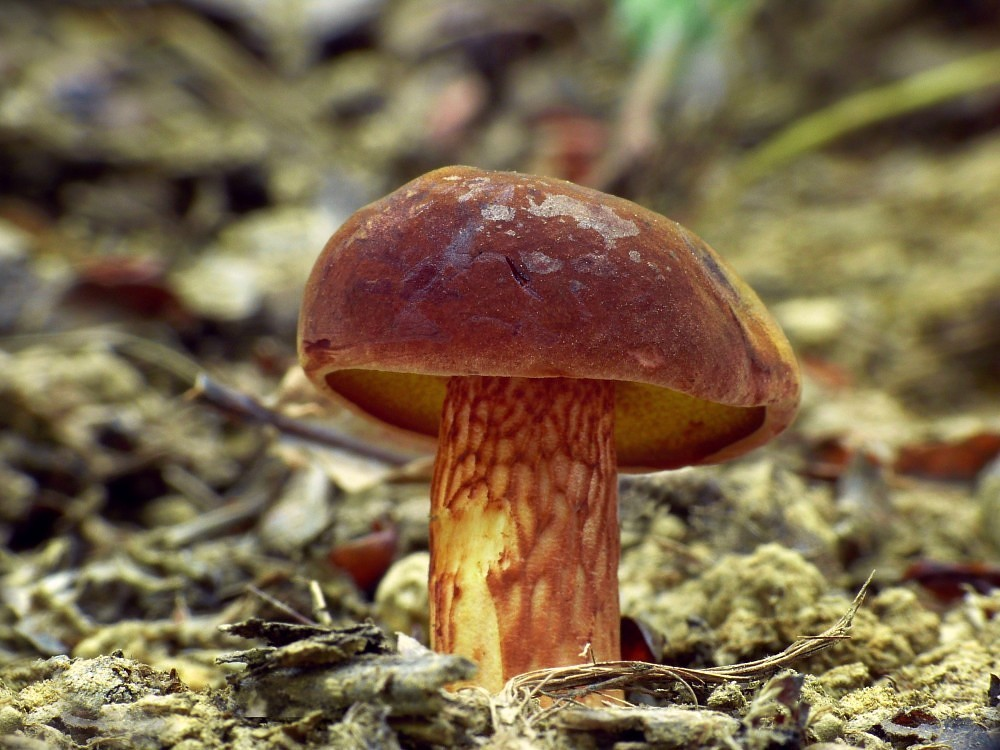

Scientific classification
- Kingdom: Fungi
- Division: Basidiomycota
- Class: Agaricomycetes
- Order: Boletales
- Family: Boletaceae
- Genus: Xerocomus
- Species: X. silwoodensis

Binomial name
- Xerocomus silwoodensis A.E.Hills, U.Eberh. & A.F.S.Taylor (2007)

= Xerocomus silwoodensis =

Species of fungus

Xerocomus silwoodensis is a species of bolete fungus first described in 2007.

== Discovery ==
It was discovered by scientists on Silwood Campus, Imperial College, London and was named after this accordingly. Its discovery on a campus of a leading academic institution has been used to show how little is known about many species. Its discovery was rated as the seventh-best discovery of a new species in 2008 by the International Institute for Species Exploration.

== Distribution ==
It has since been found at two other sites in the United Kingdom. It has also been found in France and Italy. It has therefore been asserted that it is a widespread but rare species. Later it has been found also in Czechia and Ukraine.

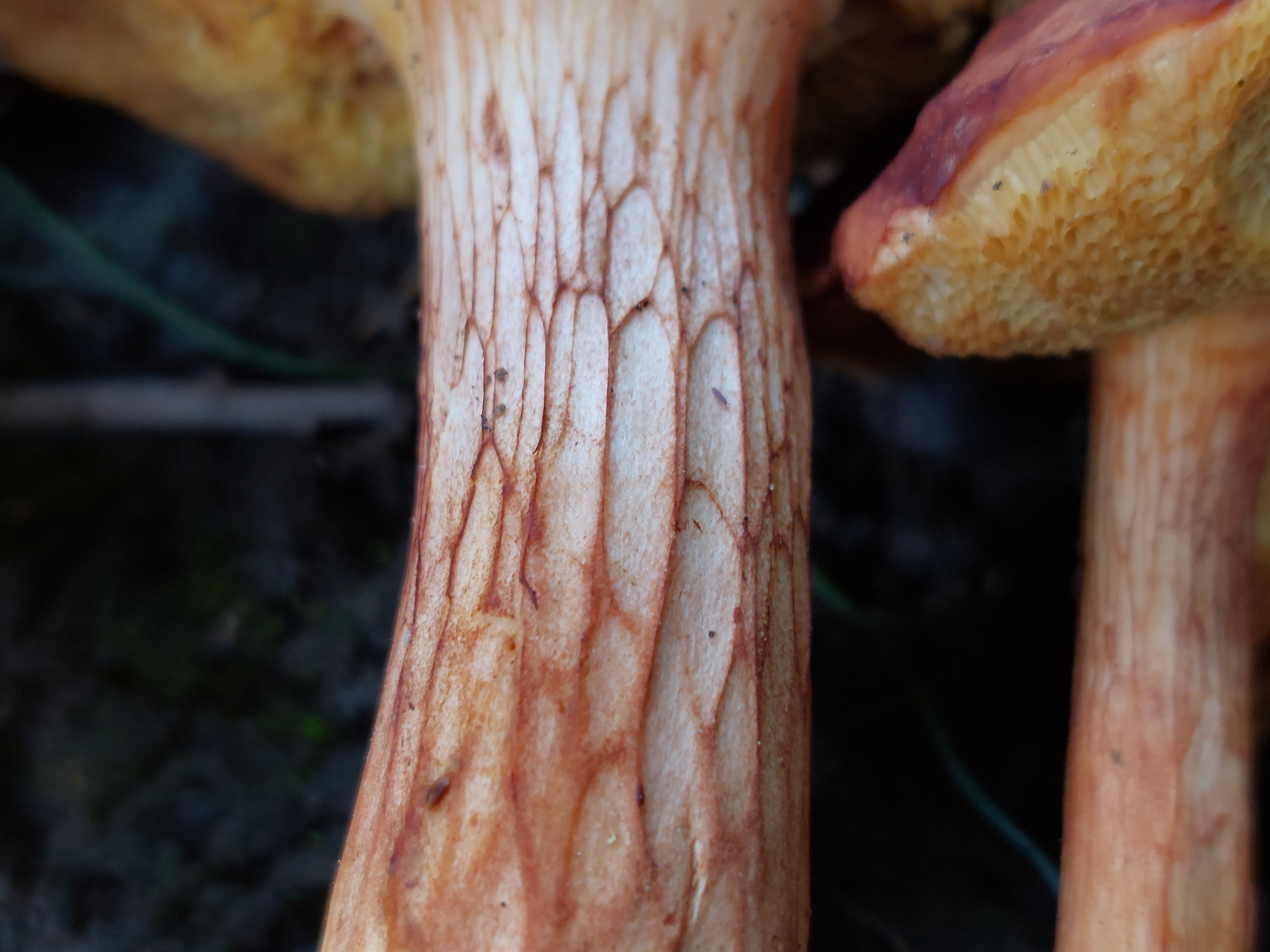
X. silwoodensis stipe

== Description ==
Molecular analysis has shown it is closely related to X. subtomentosus, and it was probably previously overlooked due to its similar appearance. It has a strong preference in associating with Populus species whereas X. chrysonemus associates with Quercus, X. subtomentosus with broadleaved hosts and X. ferrugineus with conifers. Microscopically, the spores of X. silwoodensis resemble those of X. chrysonemus, but are different from both X. subtomentosus and X. ferrugineus.
