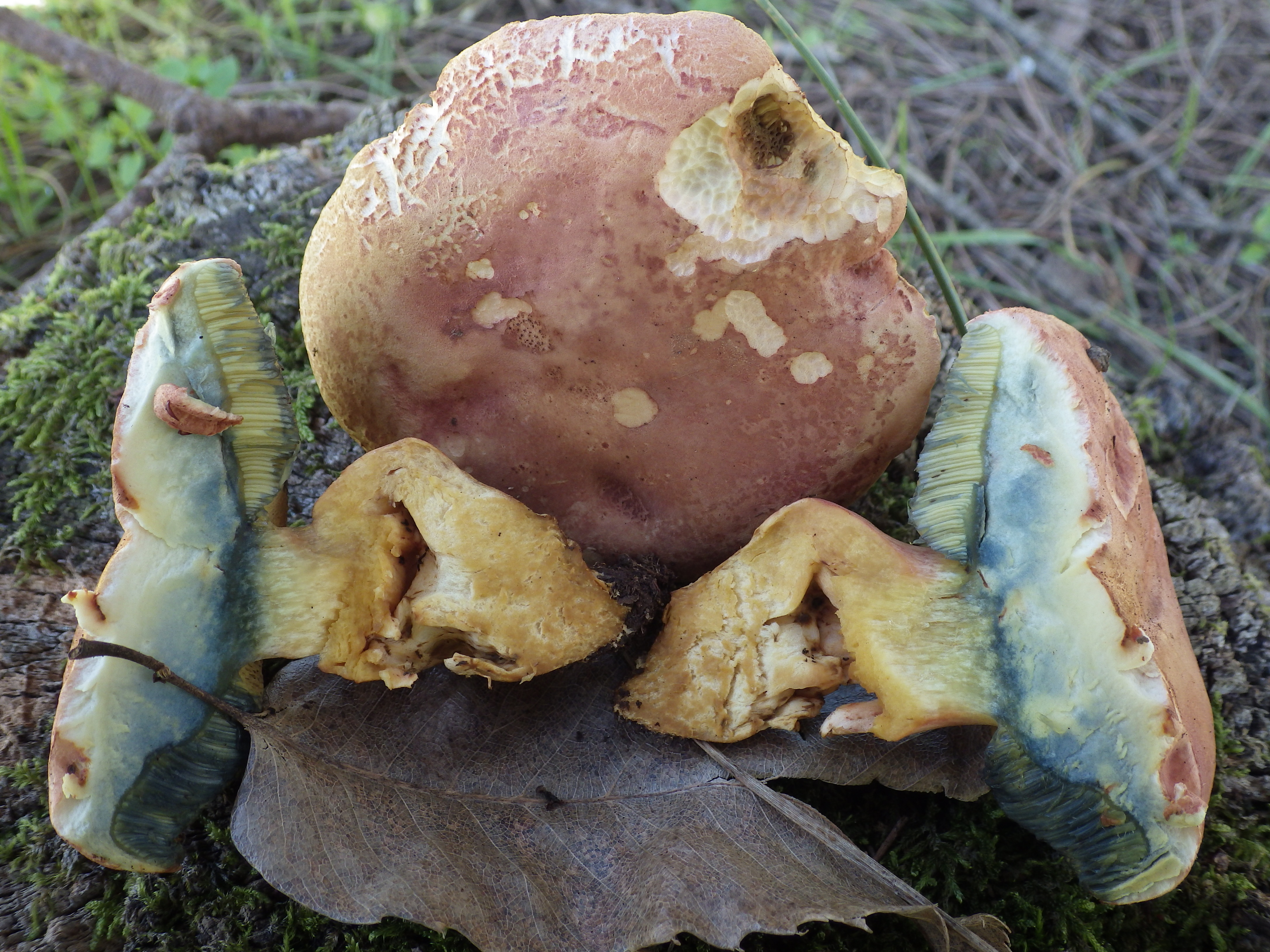

Scientific classification
- Kingdom: Fungi
- Division: Basidiomycota
- Class: Agaricomycetes
- Order: Boletales
- Family: Boletaceae
- Genus: Rheubarbariboletus
- Species: R. persicolor

Binomial name
- Rheubarbariboletus persicolor (H.Engel, Klofac, H.Grünert & R.Grünert) Vizzini, Simonini & Gelardi (2015)

Synonyms
- Xerocomus persicolor H.Engel, Klofac, H.Grünert & R.Grünert (1996); Boletus persicolor (H.Engel, Klofac, H.Grünert & R.Grünert) Assyov (2005)

= Rheubarbariboletus persicolor =

Species of bolete fungus

Rheubarbariboletus persicolor is a species of bolete fungus. It produces distinctive fruit bodies characterized by caps in peach to apricot hues that age to ochre with a pinkish tinge, bright yellow pores that bruise blue, and a yellow stipe with orange-rust spotting. The fungus typically grows on well-drained, sandy soils in Mediterranean coastal habitats dominated by holm oak, forming ectomycorrhizal relationships with the surrounding vegetation. Currently documented only from coastal locations in the Lazio region of central Italy, it fruits during autumn in maquis shrubland and pine woodland margins, often near to the Tyrrhenian Sea.

== Taxonomy ==
The fungus was originally described in 1996 as Xerocomus persicolor, based on collections made in Italy. The bolete was found in mixed woodland with hop-hornbeam, pine, and oak. In 2005, Boris Assyov proposed to transfer the taxon to the genus Boletus. The species was reclassified in the genus Rheubarbariboletus in 2015.

== Description ==
Rheubarbariboletus persicolor produces solitary or loosely clustered fruit bodies (basidiocarps) characterised by a distinct colour transition and blue‑bruising tissues. The cap (cap) measures 3.1–6.7 cm across, initially hemispherical before expanding to broadly convex and eventually flattening with maturity. Its surface is dry and finely velvety, often developing radial cracks or fissures near the margin. Young caps display apricot to peach shades—or occasionally vivid yellow‑orange—that age to ochre with a pinkish tinge. The margin starts inrolled, then straightens and may turn upward in older specimens. Underneath the cap cuticle, the flesh is pale yellow, gradually paling to a creamy‑pink at the centre and sometimes showing olive‑yellow tones in very young mushrooms.

Beneath the cap surface lies a layer of short tubes up to 7 mm long, which are bright yellow at first and range through ochre to olive yellow. These tubes are adnate to the stipe and run slightly down its surface, forming a small tooth in mature specimens. When cut or bruised, both the tubes and the tiny, initially maze‑like pores bruise blue before fading to a sordid brown. Mature pore surfaces frequently bear scattered rusty‑red flecks.

The stipe is 6.5–9.9 cm long and 0.9–3.1 cm thick, ranging from straight to curved and from uniformly cylindrical to somewhat swollen or spindle‑shaped. Its dry, smooth surface is bright yellow at the apex, becoming paler below, with orange‑rust spotting—sometimes extending along the upper stipe—and a bright yellow basal mycelium. Damage to the stipe also elicits a blue‑bruising reaction that later darkens to a blackish‑brown.

The flesh is firm yet tender, fibrous in the stipe, and pale yellow in the cap and upper stipe, deepening to chrome‑orange or intense orange nearer the base. Cutting or bruising the flesh—especially in the tubes and at the cap–stipe junction—triggers a rapid blue stain that eventually returns to the original pale hue. The odour is faintly fruity, the taste mild, and the spore print olive‑brown.

Under the microscope, the smooth, narrow to spindle‑shaped basidiospores measure about 9–17 micrometres (μm) by 3.8–7.1 μm, contain one or two oil droplets, and turn reddish‑brown in Melzer's reagent (dextrinoid). The club‑shaped basidium bear four (and occasionally two) spores and often contain bright yellow oil droplets. Sterile cells (cystidia) along the pore edges (cheilocystidia) and faces (pleurocystidia) are abundant, measuring roughly 40–80 μm long by 8–11 μm wide; they are smooth‑walled, hyaline to pale yellow, and sometimes encrusted with fine crystalline deposits.

The pileipellis (cap cuticle) is a trichoderm of erect, interwoven hyphae whose terminal cells are cylindrical to slightly club‑shaped and may bear brownish pigmentation. The stipe surface (stipitipellis) consists of loosely interlaced hyphal bundles topped by occasional club‑shaped cells similar to the cystidia. These combined features confirm the placement of this species within the Boletaceae.

== Habitat and distribution ==
Rheubarbariboletus persicolor typically fruits singly or in small clusters on well‑drained, sandy soils within open grassy clearings and along the margins of Mediterranean maquis shrubland. These habitats are dominated by holm oak (Quercus ilex) with an understory of tree heath (Erica arborea) and strawberry tree (Arbutus unedo), and may include stone pine (Pinus pinea) or narrow‑leaved mock privet (Phillyrea angustifolia) among dense, spiny shrubs. Fruiting occurs in autumn (October to early November), often when daytime temperatures range between about 5 °C and 17 °C.

This bolete is known from coastal localities in the Lazio region of central Italy, such as the Macchia Grande reserve near Fregene and the Castel Fusano pine woods near Ostia, at only 10–15 m above sea level and typically less than one kilometre from the Tyrrhenian Sea. In these sites it coexists with a characteristic Mediterranean ectomycorrhizal fungal community, including species such as Amanita phalloides, Chroogomphus rutilus, Lactarius chrysorrheus, Russula adusta and Xerocomellus dryophilus.
