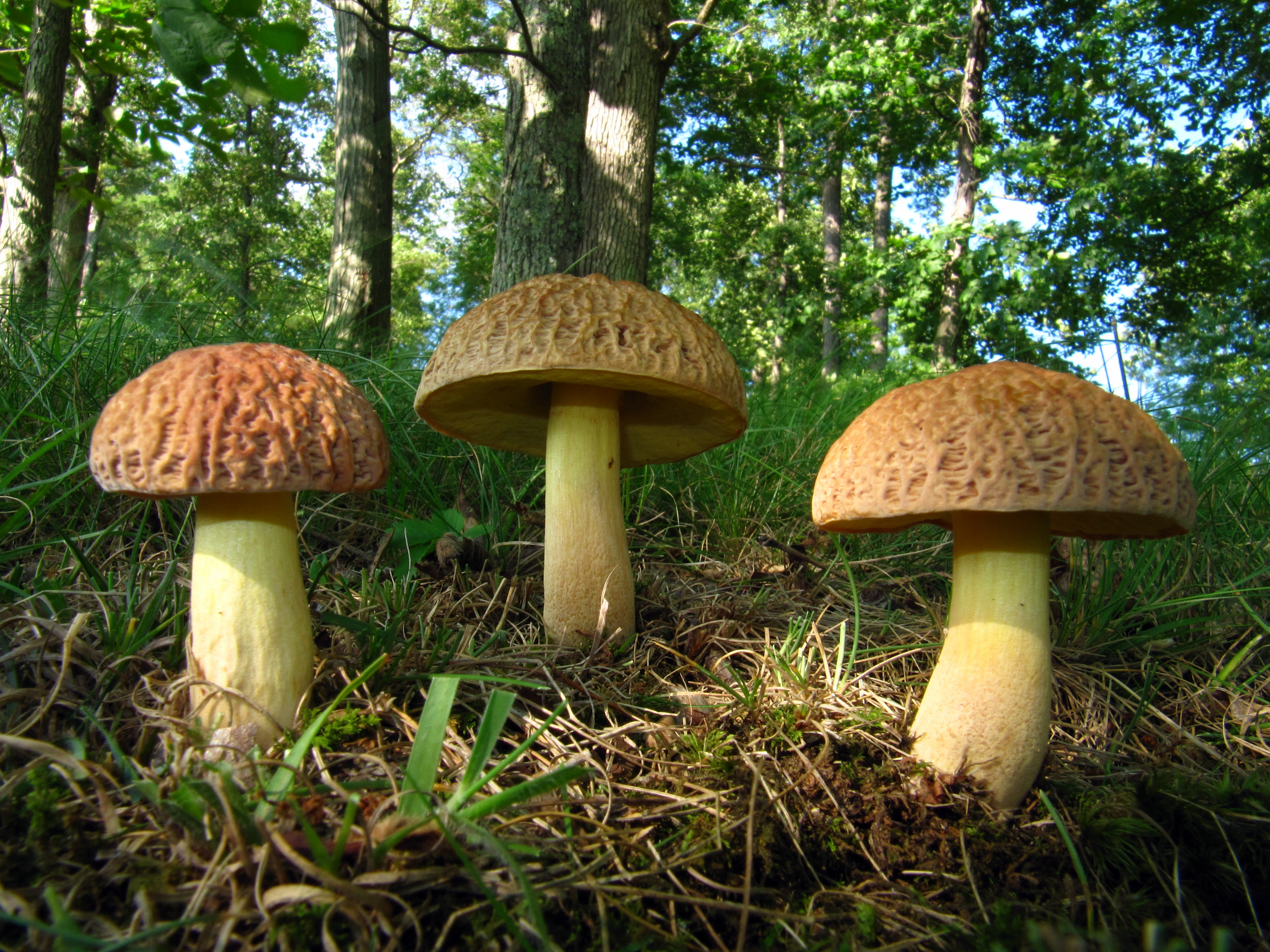

Scientific classification
- Kingdom: Fungi
- Division: Basidiomycota
- Class: Agaricomycetes
- Order: Boletales
- Family: Boletaceae
- Genus: Hemileccinum
- Species: H. hortonii

Binomial name
- Hemileccinum hortonii (A.H. Sm. & Thiers) M. Kuo & B. Ortiz

Synonyms
- Boletus hortonii A.H.Sm. & Thiers (1971); Boletus subglabripes var. corrugis Peck (1897); Leccinum hortonii (A.H.Sm. & Thiers) Hongo & Nagas. (1978); Xerocomus hortonii (A.H.Sm. & Thiers) Manfr.Binder & Besl (2000)

= Hemileccinum hortonii =

Species of fungus

Hemileccinum hortonii
- Mycological characteristics
- Pores on hymenium
- Cap is convex
- Hymenium is adnate
- Stipe is bare
- Spore print is olive-brown
- Ecology is mycorrhizal
- Edibility is choice

Hemileccinum hortonii, sometimes called Corrugated Bolete or Horton's Bolete, is a fungus of the genus Hemileccinum.

== Taxonomy ==
First described as variety corrugis of Boletus subglabripes by Charles Horton Peck in 1897, it was given its current name in 1971 by mycologists Alexander H. Smith and Harry Delbert Thiers.

== Description ==
The brownish cap is 3–12 centimetres (1 1/4–4 3/4 in) wide. The stem is 4–10 cm (1 1/2–4 in) tall and 1–2.5 cm (1/2–1 in) thick. The flesh is whitish and can stain light blue. The spore print is olive brown.

=== Similar species ===
It resembles Boletus separans, Leccinum crocipodium, and L. rugosiceps. Hemileccinum subglabripes is similar, but differs by having a relatively smooth cap and a stem covered in tiny yellow scabers.

== Distribution and habitat ==
The species can be found in the eastern United States from June to August. It grows under hardwood, mostly oak.

== Uses ==
The mushroom is edible.

== See also ==
- List of Boletus species
- List of North American boletes
