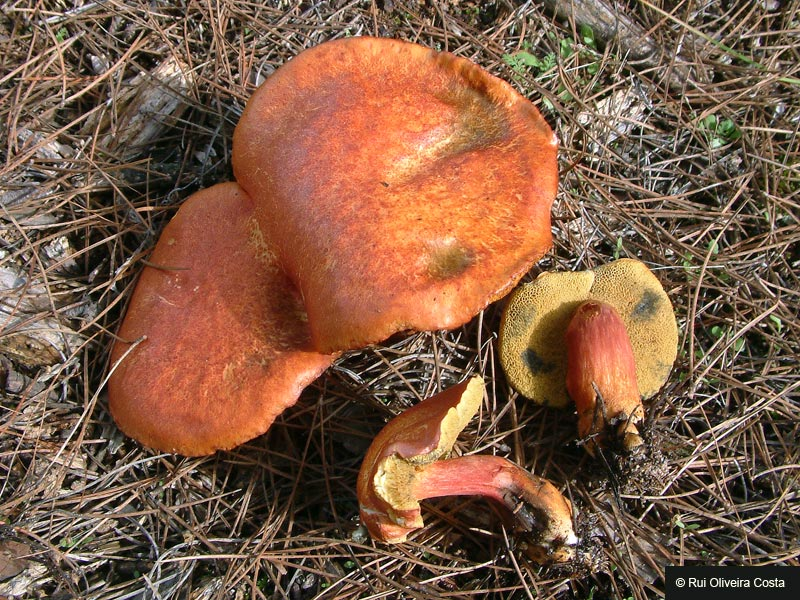
- Rheubarbariboletus armeniacus

Scientific classification
- Kingdom: Fungi
- Division: Basidiomycota
- Class: Agaricomycetes
- Order: Boletales
- Family: Boletaceae
- Genus: Rheubarbariboletus; Vizzini, Simonini & Gelardi (2005)

Type species
- Rheubarbariboletus armeniacus (Quél.) Vizzini, Simonini & Gelardi (2015)

Species
- Rheubarbariboletus armeniacus Rheubarbariboletus persicolor

= Rheubarbariboletus =

Genus of fungi

Rheubarbariboletus is a fungal genus in the family Boletaceae. Circumscribed in 2014, it contains two species found in Europe: Rheubarbariboletus persicolor, and the type, R. armeniacus. The generic name is derived from the Latin rheubarbarum, meaning "rhubarb", referring to the color of the flesh at the base of the stipe. The genus is closely related to Xerocomellus, but differs by having smooth spores, the unchanging yellowish to orange-rhubarb coloring of the stipe base, and the distinctive dark-green to black color reaction with iron sulphate on both the surface of the cap and on the flesh of the stipe.

Rheubarbariboletus persicolor was originally described in 1996 as Xerocomus persicolor, based on collections made in Italy. The bolete was found in mixed woodland with hop-hornbeam, pine, and oak.

== Species ==
Image	Scientific name	Taxon author	Year	Distribution
	Rheubarbariboletus armeniacus	(Quél.) Vizzini, Simonini & Gelardi	2015 (1885)	Hungary
	Rheubarbariboletus persicolor	(H.Engel, Klofac, H.Grünert & R.Grünert) Vizzini, Simonini & Gelardi	2015 (1996)	Italy
