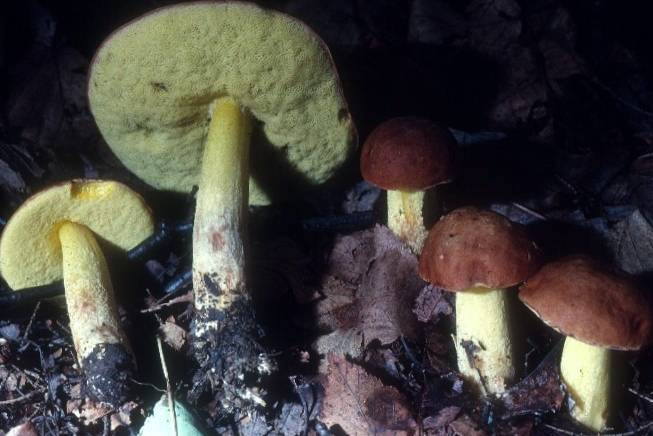

Scientific classification
- Domain: Eukaryota
- Kingdom: Fungi
- Division: Basidiomycota
- Class: Agaricomycetes
- Order: Boletales
- Family: Boletaceae
- Genus: Hemileccinum
- Species: H. subglabripes

Binomial name
- Hemileccinum subglabripes (Peck) Halling (2015)

Synonyms
- Boletus flavipes Peck (1886); Boletus subglabripes Peck (1887); Boletus subscabripes Peck; Ceriomyces subglabripes (Peck) Murrill (1909); Krombholzia subscabripes (Peck) Singer (1938); Krombholzia subglabripes (Peck) Singer (1942); Leccinum subglabripes (Peck) Singer (1945)

= Hemileccinum subglabripes =

Species of fungus

Hemileccinum subglabripes is a fungus of the family Boletaceae. It was first described by Charles Horton Peck in 1887 as Boletus subglabripes. In 2015 it was transferred to Hemileccinum based on DNA evidence.

The brownish cap is 3–10 centimetres (1 1/4–4 in) wide. The yellowish stem is 4.5–10 cm (1 3/4–4 in) tall and 1–2 cm (1/2–3/4 in) thick. The flesh is yellow, sometimes staining light blue. The smell and taste are mild. The spore print is olive brown.

It can be found in eastern North America from July to September. It is associated with hardwood trees.

The species is edible but softens quickly.

== See also ==
- List of North American boletes
