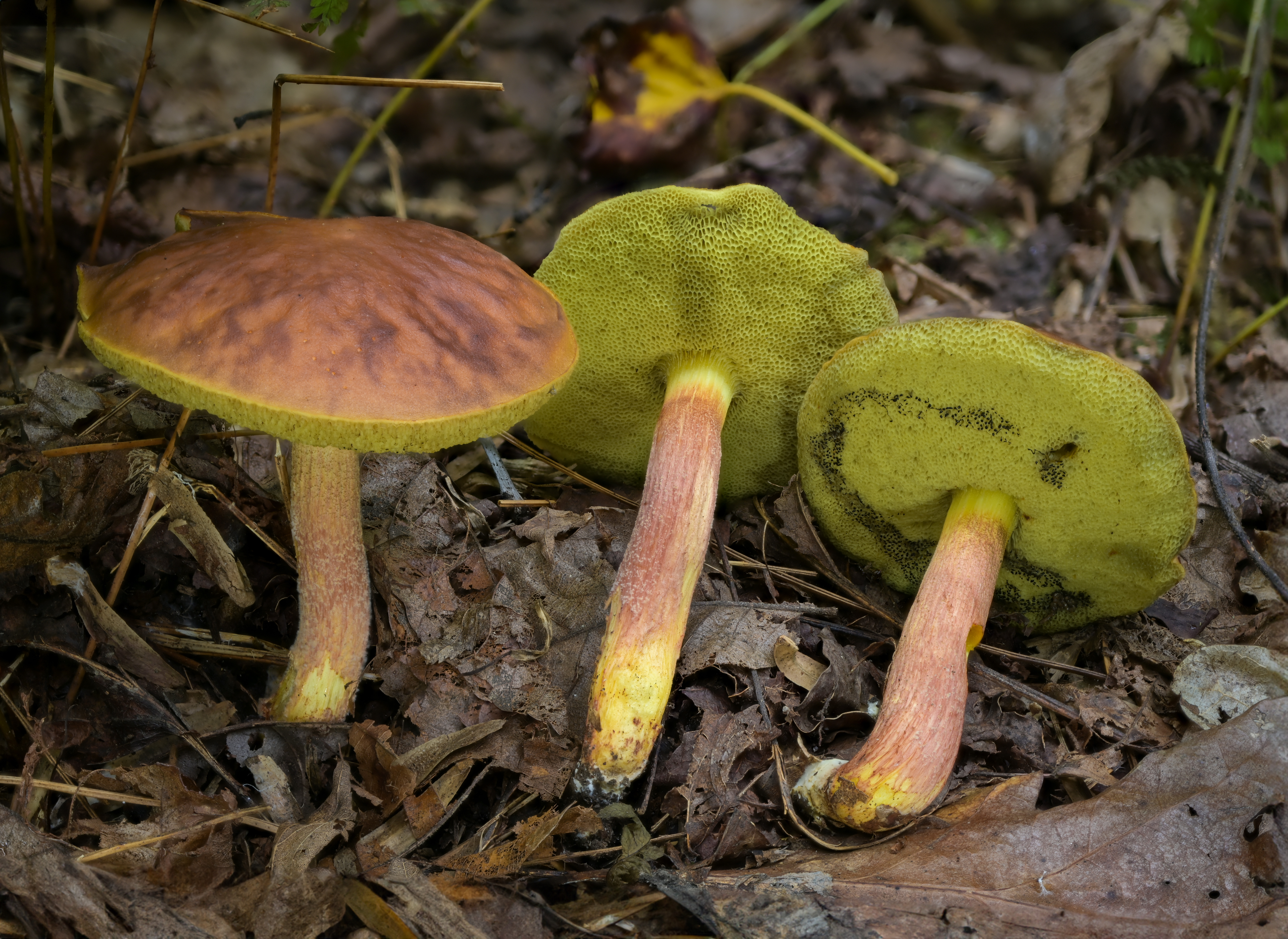
- Hemileccinum rubropunctum

Scientific classification
- Kingdom: Fungi
- Division: Basidiomycota
- Class: Agaricomycetes
- Order: Boletales
- Family: Boletaceae
- Genus: Hemileccinum; Šutara (2008)

Type species
- Hemileccinum impolitum (Fr.) Šutara (2008)

Species
- See text

= Hemileccinum =

Genus of fungi

Hemileccinum is a genus of fungi in the family Boletaceae. It was erected in 2008 by Josef Šutara to contain two species united by a number of shared morphological features: H. depilatum and the type H. impolitum. In 2014, Wu et al. found it to be distinct from other bolete genera in a molecular phylogenetic study and found it to be most closely related to Corneroboletus. In 2015, H. subglabripes was transferred to Hemileccinum from Boletus based on DNA evidence, while subsequent studies further confirmed the monophyly of the genus.

Morphological features of xerocomoid boletes

	Boletus s.str.	Hemileccinum	Xerocomellus	Xerocomus s.str.
Spore surface	Smooth	Smooth	Longitudinally striated or smooth, never bacilate	Bacilate
Hymenophoral trama	Boletoid type with gelatinous lateral strata	Boletoid type with gelatinous lateral strata	Intermediate between boletoid and phylloporoid when fully developed with distinct but weakly gelatinous lateral strata	Phylloporoid type with nongelatinous lateral strata
Pileipellis	Trichoderm, sometimes collapsing, rarely ixotrichoderm or other	Initially trichoderm but collapses with age	Initially palisadoderm, typically encrusted	Initially a trichoderm, never encrusted
Lateral stipe stratum	Frequently gelatinous, 60-90 μM thick, thicker than that of Xerocomellus	Similar to that of Leccinum species, ornamented with stipe scabrousities up to 400-640 μM thick	Frequently not present, reduced to no more than 30-40 μM thick, not gelatinous	Lateral stipe stratum never gelatinous and 80-200 μM thick

== Species ==
Image	Name	Authority	Year	Distribution
	Hemileccinum albidum	Mei-Xiang Li, Zhu L. Yang & G. Wu	2021	China (Yunnan)
	Hemileccinum brevisporum	Mei-Xiang Li, Zhu L. Yang & G. Wu	2021	China (Yunnan)
	Hemileccinum brunneotomentosum	(B. Ortiz) Nitson & J.L. Frank	2020 (2007)	Belize
	Hemileccinum depilatum	(Redeuilh) Šutara	2008 (1986)	Austria, Belgium, Bulgaria, Corsica, Croatia, Germany, France, Italy, Spain, Switzerland, Turkey, Ukraine and the United Kingdom.
	Hemileccinum ferrugineipes	Mei-Xiang Li, Zhu L. Yang & G. Wu	2021	China (Yunnan)
	Hemileccinum floridanum	J.A. Bolin, A.E. Bessette, A.R. Bessette, L.V. Kudzma, A. Farid & J.L. Frank	2021	Florida.
	Hemileccinum hortonii	(A.H. Sm. & Thiers) M. Kuo & B. Ortiz	2020 (1971)	eastern North America
	Hemileccinum impolitum	(Fr.) Šutara	2008 (1838)	United Kingdom, Estonia, France, Germany, Portugal, Spain, Sweden, Ukraine, and the Mediterranean islands of Cyprus and Sardinia.
	Hemileccinum indecorum	(Massee) G. Wu & Zhu L. Yang	2016 (1914)	Southwestern China, Thailand
	Hemileccinum parvum	Mei-Xiang Li, Zhu L. Yang & G. Wu	2021	China (Yunnan)
	Hemileccinum rubropunctum	(Peck) Halling & B. Ortiz	2020 (1898)	Eastern United States
	Hemileccinum rugosum	G. Wu & Zhu L. Yang	2016	China
	Hemileccinum subglabripes	(Peck) Halling	2015 (1889)	North America.
