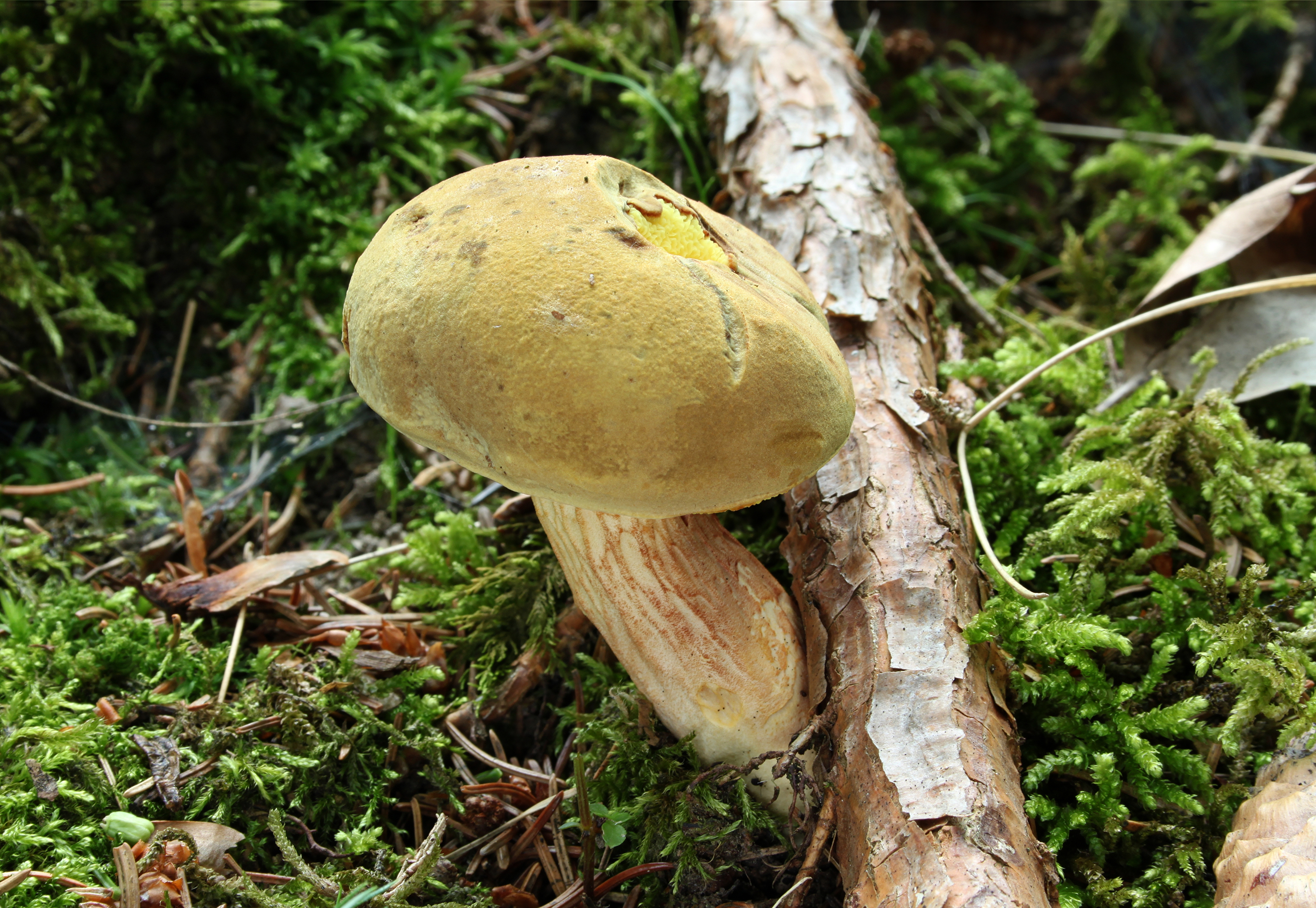

Scientific classification
- Kingdom: Fungi
- Division: Basidiomycota
- Class: Agaricomycetes
- Order: Boletales
- Family: Boletaceae
- Genus: Xerocomus
- Species: X. subtomentosus

Binomial name
- Xerocomus subtomentosus (L.) Quél. (1888)

Synonyms
- Boletus subtomentosus L. (1753); Boletus crassipes Schaeff., 1774; Boletus cupreus Schaeff.,1774; Leccinum subtomentosum (L.) Gray, 1821; Boletus lanatus Rostk., 1844; Boletus pannosus Rostk., 1844; Boletus striipes Fr., 1874; Boletus leguei Boud., 1894

= Xerocomus subtomentosus =

Xerocomus subtomentosus
- Mycological characteristics
- Pores on hymenium
- Cap is convex
- Hymenium is seceding
- Stipe is bare
- Spore print is olive-brown
- Ecology is mycorrhizal
- Edibility is edible

Xerocomus subtomentosus, commonly known as suede bolete, brown and yellow bolete, boring brown bolete or yellow-cracked bolete, is a species of bolete fungus in the family Boletaceae. The fungus was initially described by Carl Linnaeus in 1753 and known for many years as Boletus subtomentosus.

The fungus produces spore-bearing fruit bodies. The olive to tan fruit body cap is up to 10 cm (4 in) in diameter and has a distinctive velvety surface. Like other boletes, it has tubes extending downward from the underside of the cap, rather than gills; spores escape at maturity through the tube openings, or pores. The pore surface is yellow and bruises blue. The stipe, or stem, measures up to 8 cm (3 in) tall and 2 cm (3/4 in) thick.

It occurs throughout Eurasia, North America and Australia and grows with a wide range of hardwood and conifer trees. It forms symbiotic ectomycorrhizal associations with living trees by enveloping the tree's underground roots with sheaths of fungal tissue. The species is edible, though not as highly regarded as other boletes.

== Taxonomy ==
Xerocomus subtomentosus was first described in 1753 by the father of taxonomy Carl Linnaeus as Boletus subtomentosus. The starting date of fungal taxonomy had been set as January 1, 1821, to coincide with the date of the works of the 'father of mycology', Swedish naturalist Elias Magnus Fries, which meant that the name required sanction by Fries (indicated in the name by a colon) to be considered valid, as Linnaeus' work preceded this date. It was thus written Boletus subtomentosus L.:Fr. However, a 1987 revision of the International Code of Botanical Nomenclature set the starting date at May 1, 1753, the date of publication of Linnaeus' seminal work, the Species Plantarum. Hence the name no longer requires the ratification of Fries' authority.

French mycologist Lucien Quélet had classified a number of Boletus species in the genus Xerocomus, with Xerocomus subtomentosus made the type species. The genus name is derived from the Ancient Greek Xeros "dry" and kome "hair", and refers to the velvety surface of the cap. This classification was disputed, with many authorities not recognising the genus and continuing to use Boletus subtomentosus; however genetic analysis published in 2013 confirmed the distinctness of this species and its close relatives from the core group of fungi in the genus Boletus (sensu stricto).

Xerocomus subtomentosus and relatives, including Phylloporus pelletieri, form a clade known informally as the "/Xerocomus Clade" within a larger group (informally called hypoboletus) in the suborder Boletineae. Other clades within the group include the Aureoboletus and Hemileccinum clades, as well as species currently designated Boletus (though they are not closely related to Boletus edulis) and three species currently designated Boletellus (though they are unlikely to be close relatives of the type species, Boletellus ananas). The clade containing the hypoboletus group and the Royoungia clade is sister to the anaxoboletus group (containing the genera Tylopilus sensu stricto, Strobilomyces, Xanthoconium, Porphyrellus, Xerocomellus, Boletus sensu stricto, and species that require new generic names (e.g., Boletus badius) and the leccinoid group (comprising the genera Leccinellum, Leccinum, Spongiforma, and the species Retiboletus griseus). As X. subtomentosus is the type species of the genus, it and close relatives remain Xerocomus as other members are placed in different genera.

=== Etymology ===
Its specific name subtomentosus is Latin "finely haired", referring to its cap. Author David Arora nicknamed the mushroom the boring brown bolete from its lack of taste and appeal. Other vernacular names include "yellow-cracked bolete", "suede bolete", and "brown and yellow bolete".

== Description ==
The pale olive or tan cap is initially convex before flattening and measures 4 to 10 cm (1 1/2 to 4 in), exceptionally up to 20 cm (7 3/4 in) in diameter. It has a velvety tannish surface, occasionally with slits revealing yellow flesh beneath. The skin of the cap is very hard to remove. The pores underneath the cap are yellow and may bruise blue or green before fading somewhat. The stipe lacks a ring and is up to 12 cm (4 3/4 in) long and 1–2 cm (1/2–3/4 in) wide. The spore print is olive-brown. A drop of ammonium hydroxide on the cap instantly produces a mahogany red reaction, which distinguishes it from some other similar species of the genus. The flesh is white and has little taste or smell.

=== Similar species ===
The rare European species Xerocomus silwoodensis, described as new to science in 2007, is similar in appearance to X. subtomentosus. It can be distinguished from the latter in the field by the darker reddish-brown tones of the cap and its preference for associating with Populus trees. It has white flesh that becomes yellow-tinged on exposure to air. X. chrysonemus has bright yellow flesh and mycelium while X. ferrugineus is found only under conifers and also has yellow mycelium. Also similar are X. chrystenteron, X. mendocinensis, X. truncatus, Boletus chrysenteron, B. citriniporus, and B. edulis.

== Distribution and habitat ==
Xerocomus subtomentosus occurs in autumn in forests throughout Eurasia, North America and Australia and forming a mycorrhizal relationship with a wide range of hardwood and conifer trees. It has been recorded from the vicinity of Tangier in Morocco, growing under cork oak (Quercus suber). It is associated with bilberry and other evergreen shrubs of the heath family Ericaceae.

Xerocomus subtomentosus is found in subarctic areas of western Greenland, where it is common and grows in association with white birch (Betula pubescens).

== Edibility ==
Xerocomus subtomentosus is edible, although not highly regarded. Its mild taste makes it suitable for mixed mushroom dishes. An elemental analysis of specimens collected from western Poland determined the mushrooms to have abundant amounts of the electrolytes potassium, phosphorus, and magnesium, with mean values of 46000, 8400, and 1100 milligramme/kilogramme dry weight, respectively, in the caps. The levels of the toxic metals cadmium, mercury, and lead in the mushrooms "did not pose a threat to a consumer's health".

== See also ==
- List of North American boletes
