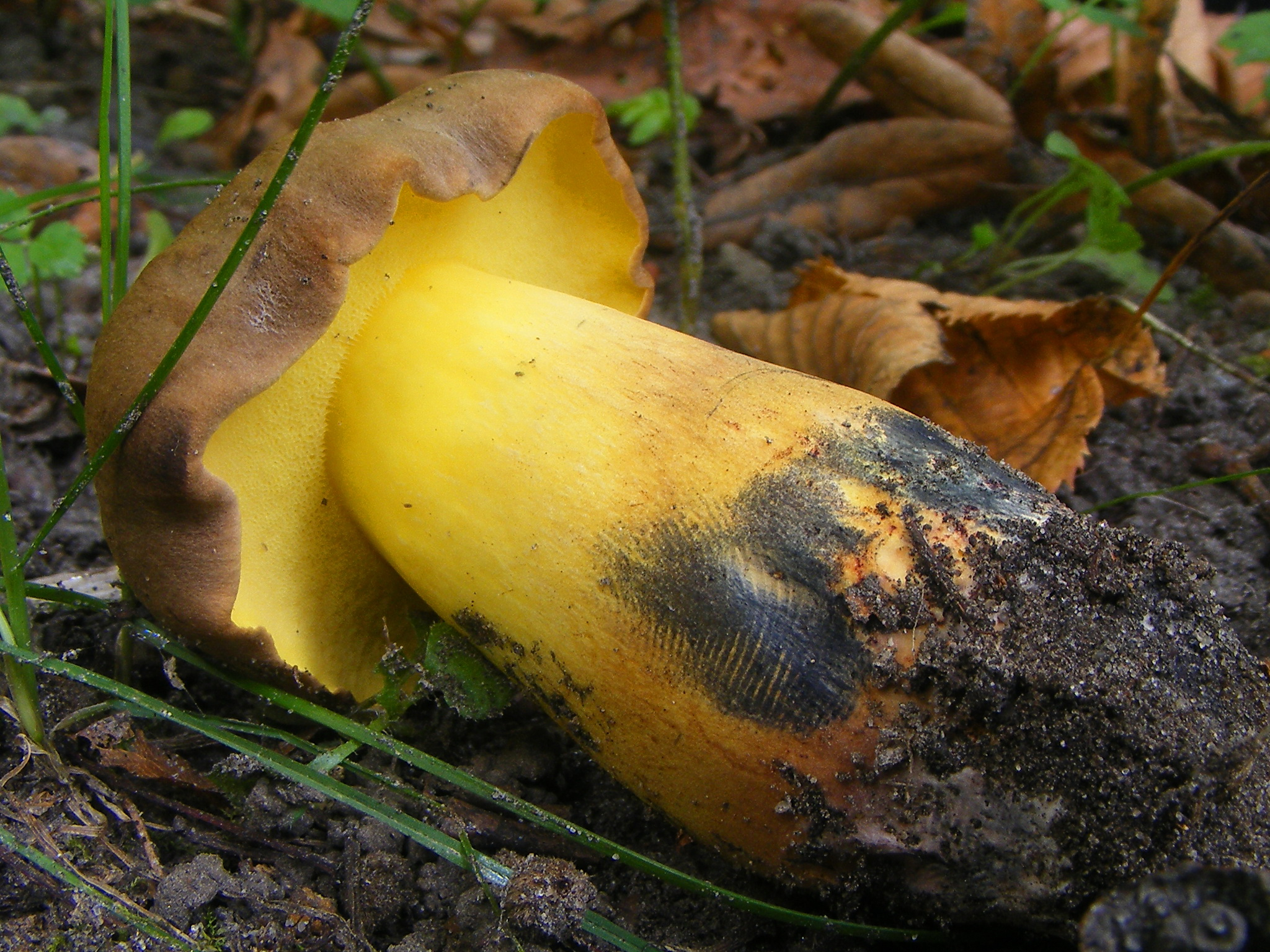
- Cyanoboletus pulverulentus

Scientific classification
- Kingdom: Fungi
- Division: Basidiomycota
- Class: Agaricomycetes
- Order: Boletales
- Family: Boletaceae
- Genus: Cyanoboletus; Gelardi, Vizzini & Simonini (2014)

Type species
- Cyanoboletus pulverulentus (Opat.) Gelardi, Vizzini & Simonini (2014)

Species
- C. flavosanguineus C. pulverulentus C. rainisii C. sinopulverulentus

= Cyanoboletus =

Genus of fungi

Cyanoboletus is a fungal genus in the family Boletaceae. Circumscribed in 2014, it contains four species: C. flavosanguineus, C. rainisii, C. sinopulverulentus, and the type, C. pulverulentus. The generic name is derived from the Ancient Greek cyano ("blue"), referring to the rapid blue bruising reaction of the fruit bodies when cut.
