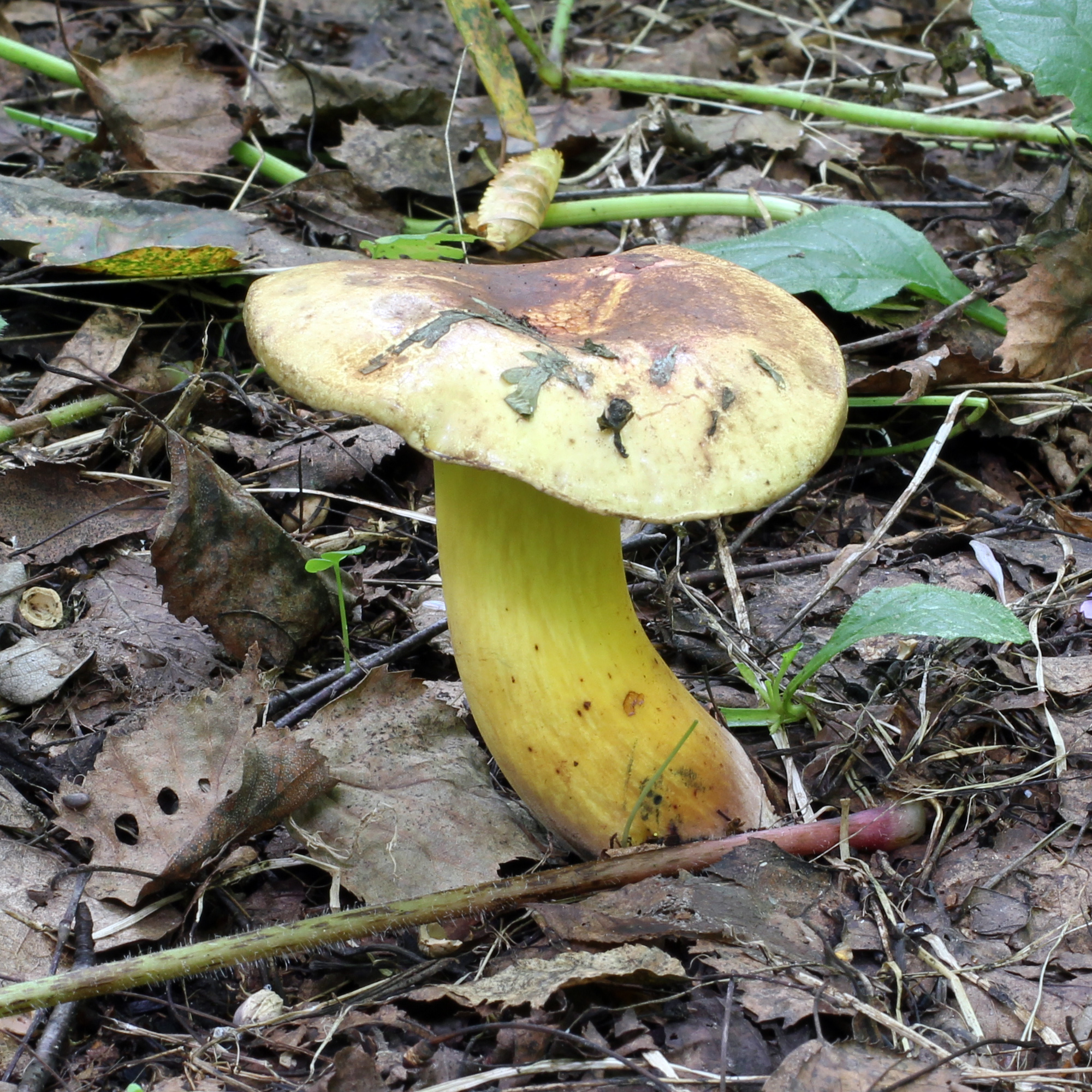

Scientific classification
- Kingdom: Fungi
- Division: Basidiomycota
- Class: Agaricomycetes
- Order: Boletales
- Family: Boletaceae
- Genus: Cyanoboletus
- Species: C. pulverulentus

Binomial name
- Cyanoboletus pulverulentus (Opat.) Gelardi, Vizzini & Simonini (2014)

Synonyms
- Boletus pulverulentus Opat. (1836); Xerocomus pulverulentus (Opat.) E.-J.Gilbert (1931); Tubiporus pulverulentus (Opat.) S.Imai (1968)

= Cyanoboletus pulverulentus =

Species of fungus

Cyanoboletus pulverulentus
- Mycological characteristics
- Pores on hymenium
- Cap is convex
- Hymenium is adnate
- Stipe is bare
- Spore print is olive-brown
- Ecology is mycorrhizal
- Edibility is edible but not recommended

Cyanoboletus pulverulentus, commonly known as the ink stain bolete, is a species of edible bolete mushroom. All parts of the mushroom will stain dark bluish-black after handling.

It is found in deciduous and mixed forests, particularly on moist soil on slopes and under beech and oak trees. A common species, it is found in northern Asia, Europe, North Africa, Central and northern South America, and eastern North America.

A recent study has revealed this mushroom hyperaccumulates arsenic compounds and therefore consumption should be limited.

== Taxonomy ==
Boletus pulverulentus was first described by German mycologist Wilhelm Opatowski in 1836. The specific epithet pulverulentus means "covered with powder" and refers to the somewhat dry powdery surface of the young cap and stalk. The fungus was transferred to the newly created genus Cyanoboletus in 2014, where it is the type species. Based on the 28S rDNA, North American collection of this fungus reported in the Genbank database (accession number KF030313) does not match that from Europe.

== Description ==
The cap is convex, flat when old, dark reddish-brown becoming lighter with age, and grows up to 10 cm (4 in) in diameter. The cap cuticle comprises a tissue layer of undifferentiated hyphae measuring 3–7 μm wide.

The stalk is long and slender, bright yellow to orange yellow at the top, and reddish-brown at the base. The flesh is yellow, with a mild taste and immediately turns blackish-blue when handled.

The basidia (spore-bearing cells) measure 22–28 by 6–8 μm. Spores are smooth, fusoid (fuse shaped) to elliptical, and measure 11–15 by 4–6 μm. The spore print colour is olive brown.

=== Similar species ===
The eastern North American lookalike Boletus oliveisporus can be distinguished from C. pulverulentus by the pink to reddish colour in the center section of its stipe. Caloboletus, Lanmaoa, and Xerocomellus species may be similar.

== Habitat and distribution ==
An ectomycorrhizal species, C. pulverulentus forms associations with coniferous and deciduous trees, particularly oak. Fruit bodies appear on the ground, usually singly, in woodland. The bolete is widely distributed, having been reported from northern Asia, Europe, North Africa, Central and northern South America, and eastern North America (from July to September). Reports of appearances in western North American could refer to the similar Cyanoboletus rainsii, which stains greenish-black instead of bluish-black.

== See also ==
- List of North American boletes
