= Melanohalea poeltii =

Scientific classification
- Kingdom: Fungi
- Division: Ascomycota
- Class: Lecanoromycetes
- Order: Lecanorales
- Family: Parmeliaceae
- Genus: Melanohalea
- Species: M. poeltii

Binomial name
- Melanohalea poeltii (Essl.) O.Blanco, A.Crespo, Divakar, Essl., D.Hawksw. & Lumbsch (2004)

Synonyms
- Melanelia poeltii Essl. (1987)

Species of lichen-forming fungus

Melanohalea poeltii is a species of foliose lichen in the family Parmeliaceae. It occurs in Nepal and northeastern India, where it grows on the bark of dwarf shrubs and other woody plants in windswept subalpine scrub.

== Taxonomy ==
The species was originally described by Ted Esslinger in 1987 as a member of the genus Melanelia. The type specimen was collected in Nepal by Josef Poelt, for whom the lichen is named. The taxon was transferred to Melanohalea in 2004 following a morphological and molecular analysis of brown parmelioid lichens.

== Description ==
Melanohalea poeltii forms a small, tightly attached (appressed) foliose thallus that rarely exceeds 6–7 cm in diameter. Its lobes are only 1–3 (sometimes up to 5) mm wide, short and rounded to slightly elongated, and often overlap one another. The upper surface varies from olive-brown to reddish-brown, darkening almost to black in the oldest parts; it is generally smooth but can appear faintly pitted or wrinkled, and the lobe tips may carry a light, powder-like bloom (pruina). Beneath, the surface is black and rather glossy with a moderate covering of simple root-like rhizines that secure the lichen to bark or rock. No reproductive structures (apothecia or pycnidia) have been observed in the type material, so the species is known only in its sterile state.

Vegetative propagules in the form of true isidia—tiny, corticate outgrowths that can break off and start new thalli—cover the older parts of the thallus. They originate as minute spherical papillae that lack the pale breathing pores (pseudocyphellae) common in related species, and develop into cylindrical to short-branched rods measuring about 0.10–0.25 mm long and 0.06–0.09 mm wide. True soredia are absent. Pseudocyphellae themselves are very sparse, small and the same colour as the surrounding cortex, making them hard to spot even under a lens.

Spot test chemistry sets M. poeltii apart from look-alike brown parmelioid lichens. All cortical tests are negative, but the medulla gives a strong PD+ reaction, turning bright yellow-orange to reddish-orange owing to fumarprotocetraric acid; other standard tests (K, C, KC) are negative. This PD-positive medulla with fumarprotocetraric acid, together with its isidiate surface, distinguishes the species from M. elegantula, which lacks detectable lichen products, and from M. olivaceoides, whose PD+ reaction is produced by isidioid soredia rather than true isidia and which lacks pseudocyphellae. Esslinger noted that the overall chemistry and habit bring M. poeltii close to the non-isidiate M. olivacea, potentially forming a "primary–secondary" species pair.

== Habitat and distribution ==
Melanohalea poeltii is a high-mountain species first described from the Mahalangur Himal in the Nepalese Khumbu. The type material was collected near Bibre (roughly 4,500–4,600 m elevation, which is above the tree line) and Pheriche (about 4,250 m), where the thallus grows tightly appressed to the bark of dwarf shrubs and other woody hosts in windswept subalpine scrubland immediately below the permanent-snow zone. Esslinger noted that its habit and choice of sheltered yet exposed twigs parallels that of M. elegantula, suggesting a preference for thin-barked vegetation in sites subject to intense ultraviolet light and large daily temperature swings.

A range extension based on later collections places the species eastward into North Sikkim, India. Here it was found at about 4,100 m on living twigs above Thangu and occurs in the same alpine scrub as, and sometimes intermixed with, the isidiate lichen M. gomukhensis. All confirmed records are corticolous, and no populations have yet been documented beyond the central and eastern Himalaya, indicating that M. poeltii is a regional endemic restricted to cold, humid high-elevation belts of that mountain chain.
