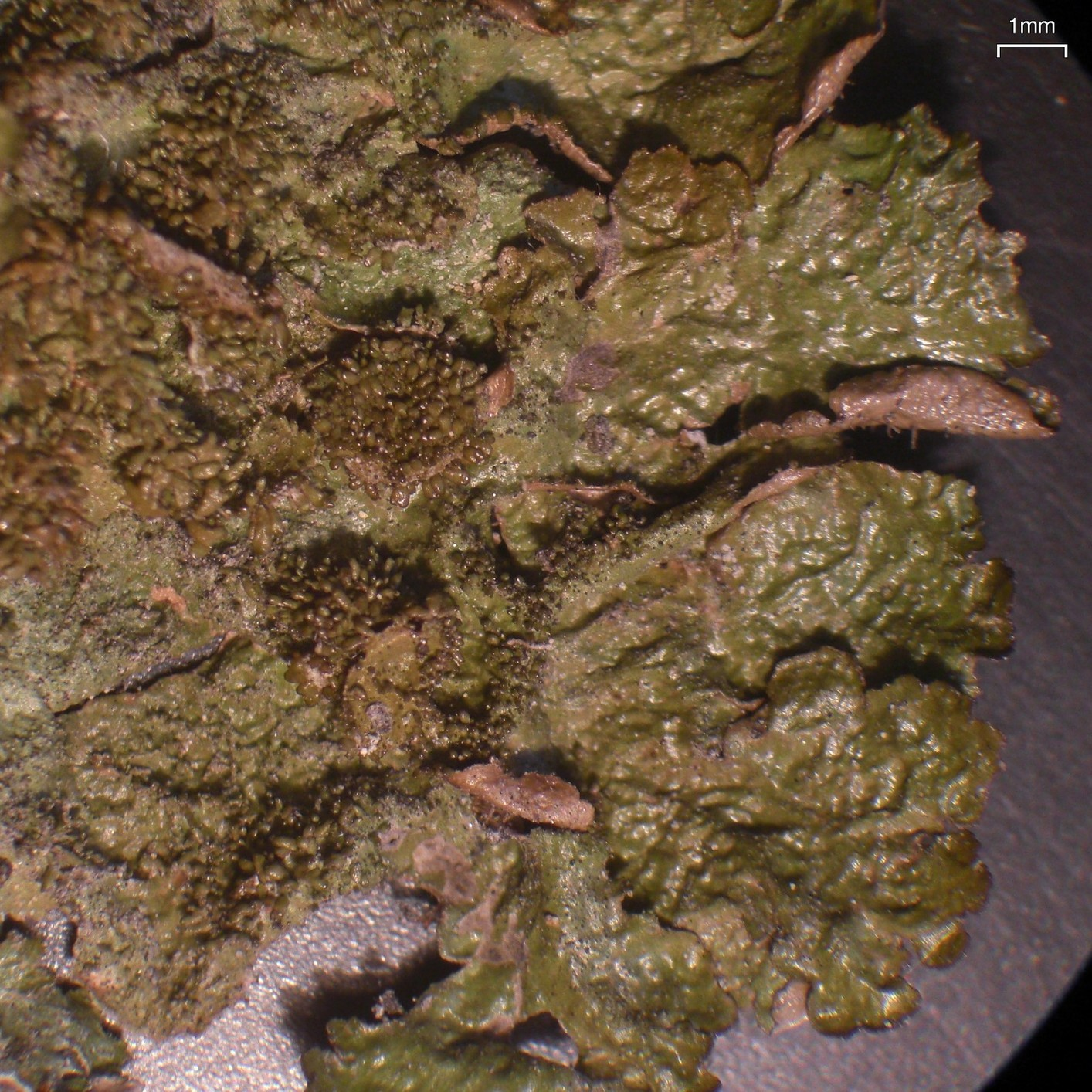

Conservation status
- Apparently Secure (NatureServe)

Scientific classification
- Kingdom: Fungi
- Division: Ascomycota
- Class: Lecanoromycetes
- Order: Lecanorales
- Family: Parmeliaceae
- Genus: Melanohalea
- Species: M. subelegantula

Binomial name
- Melanohalea subelegantula (Essl.) O.Blanco, A.Crespo, Divakar, Essl., D.Hawksw. & Lumbsch (2004)

Synonyms
- Parmelia subelegantula Essl. (1977); Melanelia subelegantula (Essl.) Essl. (1978)

= Melanohalea subelegantula =

Species of lichen-forming fungus

Melanohalea subelegantula is a species of foliose lichen in the family Parmeliaceae. It grows on tree bark and is characterized by small, finger-like outgrowths that may develop into tiny lobes. The species occurs in western North America and has also been recorded from Tibet.

== Taxonomy ==
The lichen was first formally described as Parmelia subelegantula by Ted Esslinger in 1977. A year later he transferred it to the segregate genus Melanelia. In 2004, it was moved to the newly circumscribed genus Melanohalea. Named for its resemblance to Melanohalea elegantula, it can be distinguished from that species by its slightly flattened, but not hollow, isidia. Wang and co-authors also reported that, unlike M. elegantula, the isidia of M. subelegantula lack pseudocyphellae at their tips and may grow into small, rhizinate lobules.

== Description ==
It is a corticolous (bark-dwelling) species with thalli of moderate lobes about 1–3 mm wide, a black lower surface, and moderate rhizines. It lacks pseudocyphellae, soredia and pycnidia, and chemical spot tests are negative (K−, C−, KC−, PD−) with no lichen substances detected. It produces distinctive, small isidia (about 0.1–0.3 mm long) that begin as papillae, become cylindrical, and may develop into tiny lobules that usually bear rhizines.

== Distribution ==
Previously known only from western North America, the species has also been reported from Tibet, China (at about 3,500 m), based on a 2004 bark collection; in that specimen the isidia were unusually dense and the rhizines shorter than in typical material.
