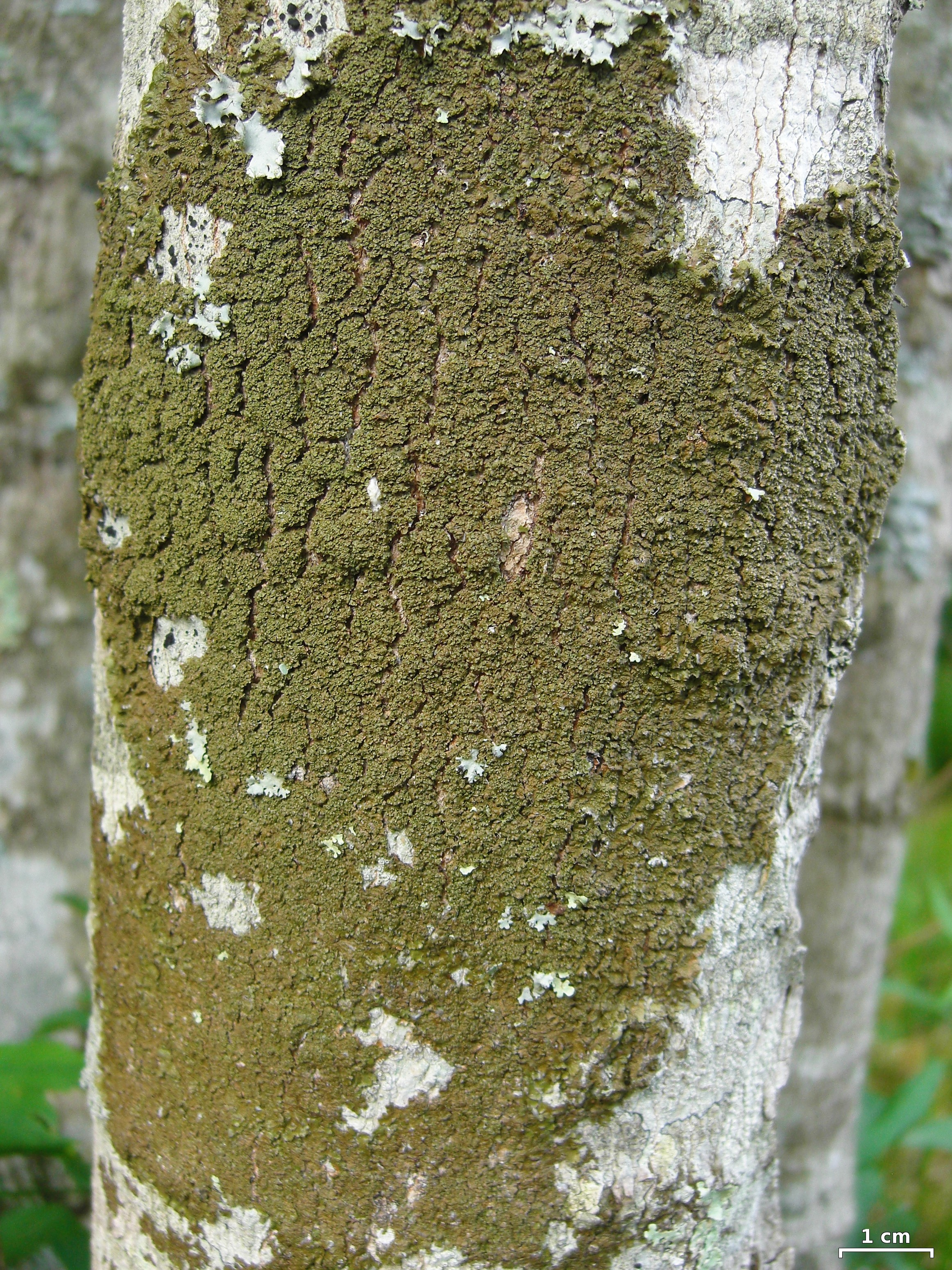

Scientific classification
- Kingdom: Fungi
- Division: Ascomycota
- Class: Lecanoromycetes
- Order: Lecanorales
- Family: Parmeliaceae
- Genus: Melanohalea
- Species: M. halei

Binomial name
- Melanohalea halei (Ahti) O.Blanco, A.Crespo, Divakar, Essl., D.Hawksw. & Lumbsch (2004)

Synonyms
- Parmelia halei Ahti (1966); Melanelia halei (Ahti) Essl. (1978)

= Melanohalea halei =

Species of lichen-forming fungus

Melanohalea halei is a species of foliose lichen in the family Parmeliaceae. The species was first described in 1966 by the Finnish lichenologist Teuvo Ahti from specimens in eastern North America that had previously been misidentified as Melanohalea olivacea. It is distinguished from similar brown foliose lichens by its yellowish- to greenish-brown colour, a thallus that lies closely against the bark and develops tiny side lobes toward the center, and a medulla that reacts K+ (yellow0 and P+ (red) in standard chemical spot tests. The lichen typically forms roundish patches about 10 cm (4 in) across on tree bark and produces distinctive reddish-brown, cup-shaped fruiting bodies (apothecia) that are usually present on older specimens. Originally known only from the Appalachian region and temperate hardwood forests of eastern North America—where it grows mainly on deciduous trees such as oak, maple, and beech—the species has more recently been recorded from Ontario's Great Lakes region and from mountain forests in Xinjiang, China.

== Taxonomy ==
In 1966, Teuvo Ahti described this lichen as a new species under the name Parmelia halei, based on North American material that had long been filed under Parmelia olivacea. The type specimen was collected in 1893 at St. Francis in Aroostook County, Maine, and was distributed in the exsiccata series Lich. Bor-Amer. as "Parmelia olivacea". Ahti chose the epithet halei in honor of Mason E. Hale, and he treated the taxon as a distinct species rather than an infraspecific variant of P. olivacea.

Theodore Esslinger reclassified the species in the genus Melanelia in 1978. Subsequent molecular work on the "brown parmelioid" species traditionally placed in Melanelia showed that Melanelia (as then circumscribed) was not a single natural group. Using a combined analysis of three ribosomal gene regions (nuclear ITS and LSU, plus mitochondrial SSU) together with morphological characters, Blanco and coauthors split the bark-dwelling members of Melanelia into separate lineages and introduced the genus Melanohalea for the M. glabra group. In that treatment, Ahti's Parmelia halei (later placed in Melanelia) was recombined as Melanohalea halei; the genus was characterized by features such as a non-pored epicortex and the presence of pseudocyphellae (often associated with warts or isidial tips), and it includes species that are mainly bark- and wood-dwelling in the Northern Hemisphere.

== Description ==
Melanohalea halei is a foliose lichen that typically forms roundish to irregular rosettes about 10 cm (4 in) across. The lobes are yellowish- to greenish-brown and about 1–4 mm wide; they are often layered toward the center, and the lobe margins commonly develop small lobules. Lobe tips are smooth and somewhat shiny, while the central parts of the thallus are duller and minutely roughened. Vegetative propagules are lacking: the thallus does not form soredia or true isidia, and laminal pseudocyphellae are absent or very sparse. The lower surface is coal-black with a dark brown marginal rim, and it is densely rhizinate; the rhizines are black to brown, typically about 25–30 μm long, and simple or only sparsely branched. In section, the lobes are about 160 μm thick, with an upper cortex 20–25 μm thick, an algal layer 40–55 μm, a medulla 80–100 μm, and a lower cortex about 20 μm thick. In the Great Smoky Mountains, it is reported to be the most common brown Melanohalea and can be recognized in the field even though it is variable in form; the lobes remain closely attached to the surface and the thallus stays some shade of brown or olive, without soredia or isidia.

Apothecia (fruiting bodies) are common on older thalli but are seldom abundant; they are about 3–5 mm wide, distinctly short-stalked, and strongly concave, with a reddish-brown disc. The margin is raised and inrolled, crenulate, and bears abundant pseudocyphellae. The subhymenium is about 45–55 μm thick and the hymenium about 60–70 μm. Asci are clavate (about 25–30 × 45–60 μm) and contain eight simple, ovoid ascospores measuring about 9–9.5 × 11–19 μm. Pycnidia are sparse, producing straight, cylindrical conidia about 0.5–1 × 5–7 μm. The pycnidia may visible on the thallus as tiny brown spots. Spot tests are PD+ red (usually immediate), K+ yellow turning reddish (more slowly), and C−/KC−. The secondary metabolites (lichen products) atranorin and fumarprotocetraric acid were reported from the species. For specimens collected in Xinjiang, Habul and coauthors reported medullary spot-test reactions of K+ (red-brown fading to pale yellow), PD+ (faint red), and C−, and they identified fumarprotocetraric acid together with norstictic acid using thin-layer chromatography.

Melanohalea halei is similar to M. olivacea, but M. olivacea has pseudocyphellae and broader lobes with larger ascospores, whereas M. halei tends to be darker with narrower, more rounded lobes.

== Habitat and distribution ==
In Ahti's original account, the species was known only from eastern North America, mainly in the Appalachian region and nearby temperate hardwood forests, with records extending from Quebec and New Brunswick south to North Carolina; he reported that it had been collected especially often in the Great Smoky Mountains. In the central and southern Appalachians it is reported from bark and twigs at higher elevations, and in the Smokies it is associated with habitats that also support a more northerly element in the flora. Ahti also mapped a single, disjunct locality on the east shore of Lake Superior (in the hemiboreal zone), but treated the species as essentially part of the "Appalachian element". Based on herbarium labels, he noted that it usually grows on trees—most often on deciduous genera such as ash (Fraxinus), oak (Quercus), maple (Acer), and beech (Fagus), but also occasionally on firs including balsam fir (Abies balsamea) and Fraser fir (A. fraseri)—and that it is often collected in deep shade. A recent collection from the Algoma District of Ontario (near Mamainse Lake, south of Batchewana Bay) provides a modern voucher-based record for the Great Lakes region and reconfirms the species' presence in Ontario after more than 60 years; the specimen was collected in mixed forest on sugar maple (Acer saccharum) and yellow birch (Betula alleghaniensis). In a 2018 study of Melanohalea material from Xinjiang, China, Habul and coauthors reported M. halei as new to China, based on specimens collected in Burqin County (Tulekebai area) at about 1,900 m (6,200 ft) elevation; the authors recorded it growing on bark and also on dead wood.

In a field study of epiphytic macrolichens at Hubbard Brook Experimental Forest in northern New Hampshire, Clyne and coauthors documented widespread grazing damage by terrestrial gastropods (slugs and snails), though severe damage was uncommon. They also reported that grazing was sometimes directed at reproductive structures, including the apothecia of Melanohalea halei, which could affect reproduction or dispersal.
