= Xanthoparmelia pseudepheboides =

Scientific classification
- Kingdom: Fungi
- Division: Ascomycota
- Class: Lecanoromycetes
- Order: Lecanorales
- Family: Parmeliaceae
- Genus: Xanthoparmelia
- Species: X. pseudepheboides

Binomial name
- Xanthoparmelia pseudepheboides (Essl.) O.Blanco, A.Crespo, Elix, D.Hawksw. & Lumbsch (2004)

Synonyms
- Neofuscelia pseudepheboides Essl. (2000); Neofuscelia pseudocafferensis Essl. (2000); Xanthoparmelia pseudocafferensis (Essl.) O.Blanco, A.Crespo, Elix, D.Hawksw. & Lumbsch (2004)

Species of lichen-forming fungus

Xanthoparmelia pseudepheboides is a species of foliose lichen in the family Parmeliaceae. It has a dark brown, highly branched thallus that grows loosely attached to rock surfaces. The species is found in mountainous areas of the Cape Floristic Region in South Africa.

== Taxonomy ==
It was first described by Theodore Lee Esslinger in 2000 from specimens found in South Africa. He originally classified it in Neofuscelia, but that genus was later synonymized with Xanthoparmelia. Its appearance shares some similarities with Pseudephebe minuscula and Melanelia stygia, particularly in the texture and form of its thallus.

== Description ==
The thallus of Xanthoparmelia pseudepheboides is either foliose (leaf-like) or partly prostrate and cushion-like (somewhat fruticose and pulvinate), loosely attached or slightly elevated above the substrate. It grows up to 3–4 cm (1.2–1.6 in) in diameter, though it can form larger colonies. The lobes are narrow and highly branched, with a smooth, glossy, dark brown surface that becomes irregular and dull inward. It lacks common reproductive propagules like soredia or isidia, but forms pseudocyphellae, which are depressed, rounded to irregular patches on the thallus surface.

The underside of the thallus is tan to pale brown, moderately to sparsely covered with rhizines (root-like structures), which help anchor the lichen to its substrate. The lichen's chemical spot test reactions include a bluish-green color change when treated with nitric acid, but no other secondary metabolites have been detected in this species.

== Habitat and distribution ==
Xanthoparmelia pseudepheboides is found in the Cape Floristic Region of South Africa, particularly in areas like Die Poort se Nek near Sutherland, and other localities across the Cape Province. It typically grows in mountainous, rocky areas.

== See also ==
- List of Xanthoparmelia species
