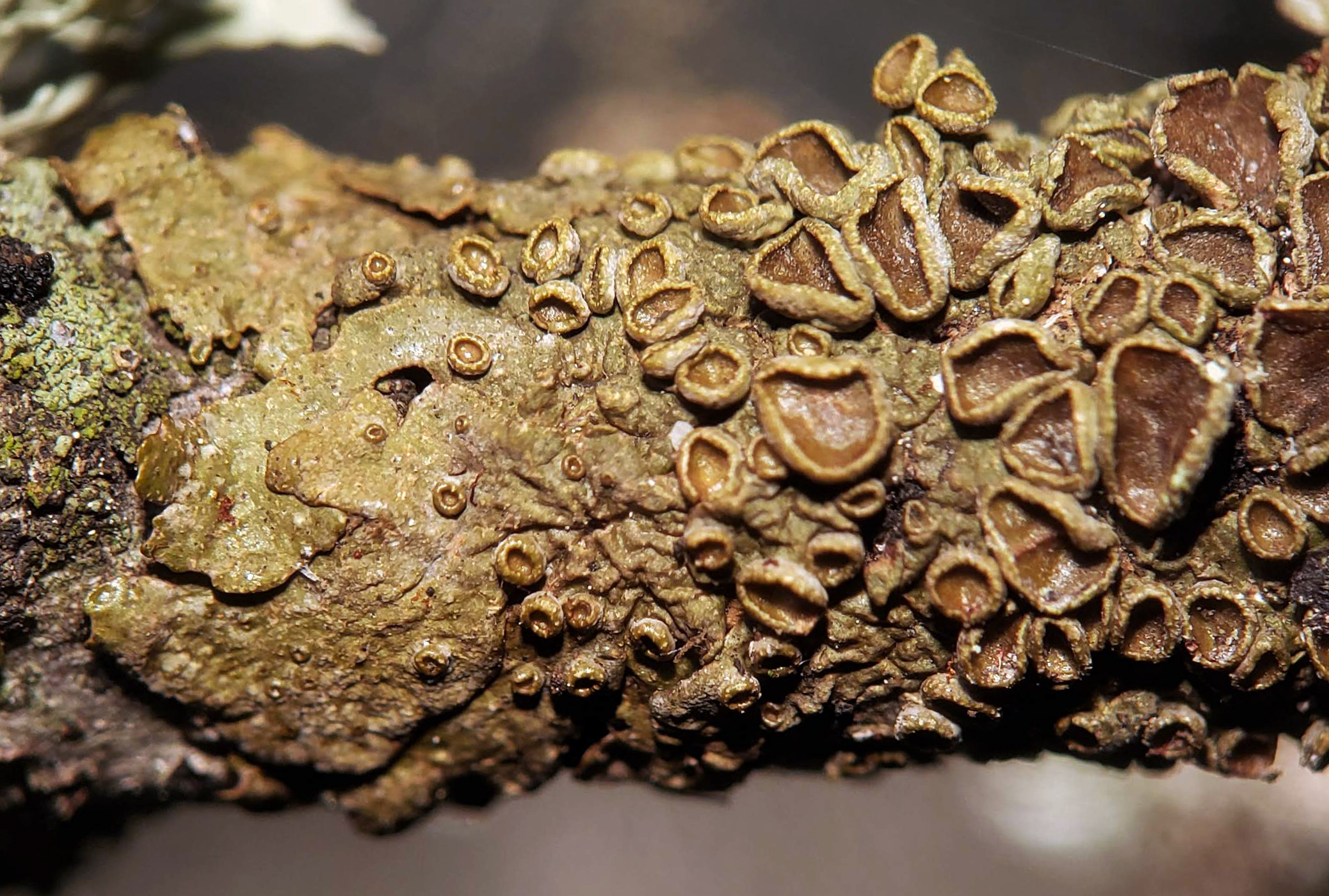

Scientific classification
- Domain: Eukaryota
- Kingdom: Fungi
- Division: Ascomycota
- Class: Lecanoromycetes
- Order: Lecanorales
- Family: Parmeliaceae
- Genus: Melanohalea
- Species: M. subolivacea

Binomial name
- Melanohalea subolivacea (Nyl. ex Hasse) O.Blanco, A.Crespo, Divakar, Essl., D.Hawksw. & Lumbsch (2004)

Synonyms
- Parmelia subolivacea Nyl. ex Hasse (1897); Melanelia subolivacea (Nyl. ex Hasse) Essl. (1978)

= Melanohalea subolivacea =

Species of lichen in the family Parmeliaceae

Melanohalea subolivacea, commonly known as the brown-eyed camouflage lichen, is a species of foliose lichen in the family Parmeliaceae.

== Taxonomy ==
The lichen was first documented by Finnish lichenologist William Nylander. The type specimen was found growing on rocks in the San Gabriel Mountains of Southern California, at an elevation of 1,500 m (4,900 ft). The lichen was formally described in a publication by American lichenologist Hermann Edward Hasse in 1897, with authorship attributed to Nylander. Named for its resemblance to Parmelia olivacea, it was distinguished from that species by its spore size, measuring 8–9 by 5 μm. It was transferred to the genus Melanelia by Ted Esslinger in 1978, and then to the newly circumscribed genus Melanohalea in 2004. Melanohalea subolivacea has been given the common name "brown-eyed camouflage lichen".

Molecular phylogenetic studies of Melanohalea species show that Melanohalea subolivacea is closely related, but genetically distinct from M. clairi and M. mexicana. This group of more or less morphologically indistinguishable species represent distinct evolutionary lineages that have diverged relatively recently.

== Description ==
Melanohalea subolivacea has a thin, flattened, brown to olive-brown thallus that lacks isidia or soredia. The lobes comprising the thallus measure 1–4 mm wide, and have a smooth brown lower surface that is attached to the substrate by many rhizines. There are typically lots of fruiting bodies – the apothecia – which are flat, disc-shaped, and red-brown with thin margins.

== Habitat and distribution ==
Melanohalea subolivacea is a largely North American species that usually grows on bark, although on rare instances it has been recorded growing on wood. It is common on deciduous trees, particularly in dry forests.
