= Melanohalea davidii =

Scientific classification
- Kingdom: Fungi
- Division: Ascomycota
- Class: Lecanoromycetes
- Order: Lecanorales
- Family: Parmeliaceae
- Genus: Melanohalea
- Species: M. davidii

Binomial name
- Melanohalea davidii S.D.Leav., Essl., Divakar, A.Crespo & Lumbsch (2016)

Species of lichen in the family Parmeliaceae

Melanohalea davidii is a species of foliose lichen in the family Parmeliaceae. It was described as a new species in 2016 and named in honour of lichenologist David Leslie Hawksworth. Though morphologically similar to Melanohalea exasperata, genetic analysis has established it as a distinct species, with DNA sequence data revealing fixed differences between the two taxa. The lichen is known from only two mid-elevation sites in Spain, where it grows as an epiphyte on oak and pine trees. Its restricted distribution suggests it may represent a relict species associated with Pleistocene glacial refugia in the Iberian Peninsula.

== Taxonomy ==
Melanohalea davidii was formally described as a new species in 2016 by Steven Leavitt, Ted Esslinger, Pradeep Divakar, Ana Crespo, and H. Thorsten Lumbsch. Prior to its formal description, specimens representing this taxon had been referred to as "M. exasperata SPAIN" in earlier molecular phylogenetics studies. The type was collected Crespo in the Sierra de Grazalema Natural Park in the province of Cádiz, Spain, where it was found growing on cluster pine. In addition to the type locality, it has also been recorded from Selas in the province of Guadalajara. The specific epithet davidii honours lichenologist David Leslie Hawksworth for his contributions to fungal systematics.

Though morphologically similar to Melanohalea exasperata, genetic analysis clearly distinguishes it as a separate species. DNA sequence data from the fungal barcoding marker (ITS) reveal fixed differences between M. davidii and M. exasperata. Despite its morphological resemblance to M. exasperata, phylogenetic reconstructions suggest M. davidii is more closely related to M. elegantula. M. davidii represents one of several cryptic species in the Parmeliaceae that appear morphologically similar to previously described taxa but are genetically distinct.

== Habitat and distribution ==
Melanohalea davidii is known from only two mid-elevation sites in Spain, both located at elevations between 1100 and 1500 metres above sea level. The type specimen was collected in the Sierra de Grazalema in the Province of Cádiz in southern Spain, while the second known population occurs in Selas in the Province of Guadalajara in central Spain. The species has been found growing as an epiphyte (a plant that grows on another plant non-parasitically) on both Quercus (oak) and Pinus (pine) species.

The restricted distribution of M. davidii in Spain may be significant from a biogeographical perspective. Researchers have suggested it could potentially represent a relict species associated with Pleistocene glacial refugia, which are well-documented for various organisms in the Iberian Peninsula.
