= Melanohalea zopheroa =

Scientific classification
- Kingdom: Fungi
- Division: Ascomycota
- Class: Lecanoromycetes
- Order: Lecanorales
- Family: Parmeliaceae
- Genus: Melanohalea
- Species: M. zopheroa

Binomial name
- Melanohalea zopheroa (Essl.) O.Blanco, A.Crespo, Divakar, Essl., D.Hawksw. & Lumbsch (2004)

Synonyms
- Parmelia zopheroa Essl. (1977); Melanelia zopheroa (Essl.) Essl. (1978)

Species of lichen

Melanohalea zopheroa is a species of lichen in the family Parmeliaceae. It was first formally described in 1977 by Ted Esslinger as Parmelia zopheroa. A year later, he transferred it to the new genus Melanelia, which he created to contain the brown Parmeliae species. In 2004, after early molecular phylogenetic evidence showed that Melanelia was not monophyletic, Melanohalea was circumscribed by lichenologists Oscar Blanco, Ana Crespo, Pradeep K. Divakar, Esslinger, David L. Hawksworth and H. Thorsten Lumbsch, and M. zopheroa was transferred to it. The lichen has a disjunct distribution, as it is found in South America (Chile) and in New Zealand.

David Galloway and Per Magnus Jørgensen have suggested that Melanohalea zopheroa is a sorediate counterpart of the New Zealand species Melanelia inactiva.
