= Melanohalea austroamericana =

Scientific classification
- Kingdom: Fungi
- Division: Ascomycota
- Class: Lecanoromycetes
- Order: Lecanorales
- Family: Parmeliaceae
- Genus: Melanohalea
- Species: M. austroamericana

Binomial name
- Melanohalea austroamericana Essl., Divakar, A.Crespo, S.Leavitt & Lumbsch (2016)

Species of lichen

Melanohalea austroamericana is a species of foliose lichen in the family Parmeliaceae. It was described as a new species in 2016. The lichen is known only from two specimens collected in Chile's Laguna del Laja National Park, where they were discovered growing on bark in a forest of Chilean cedar. The specific epithet austroamericana refers to its South American distribution.

Although Melanohalea ushuaiensis is somewhat similar in appearance to Melanohalea austroamericana, the latter species is clearly distinguished from the former by the presence of both soredia and isidia.
