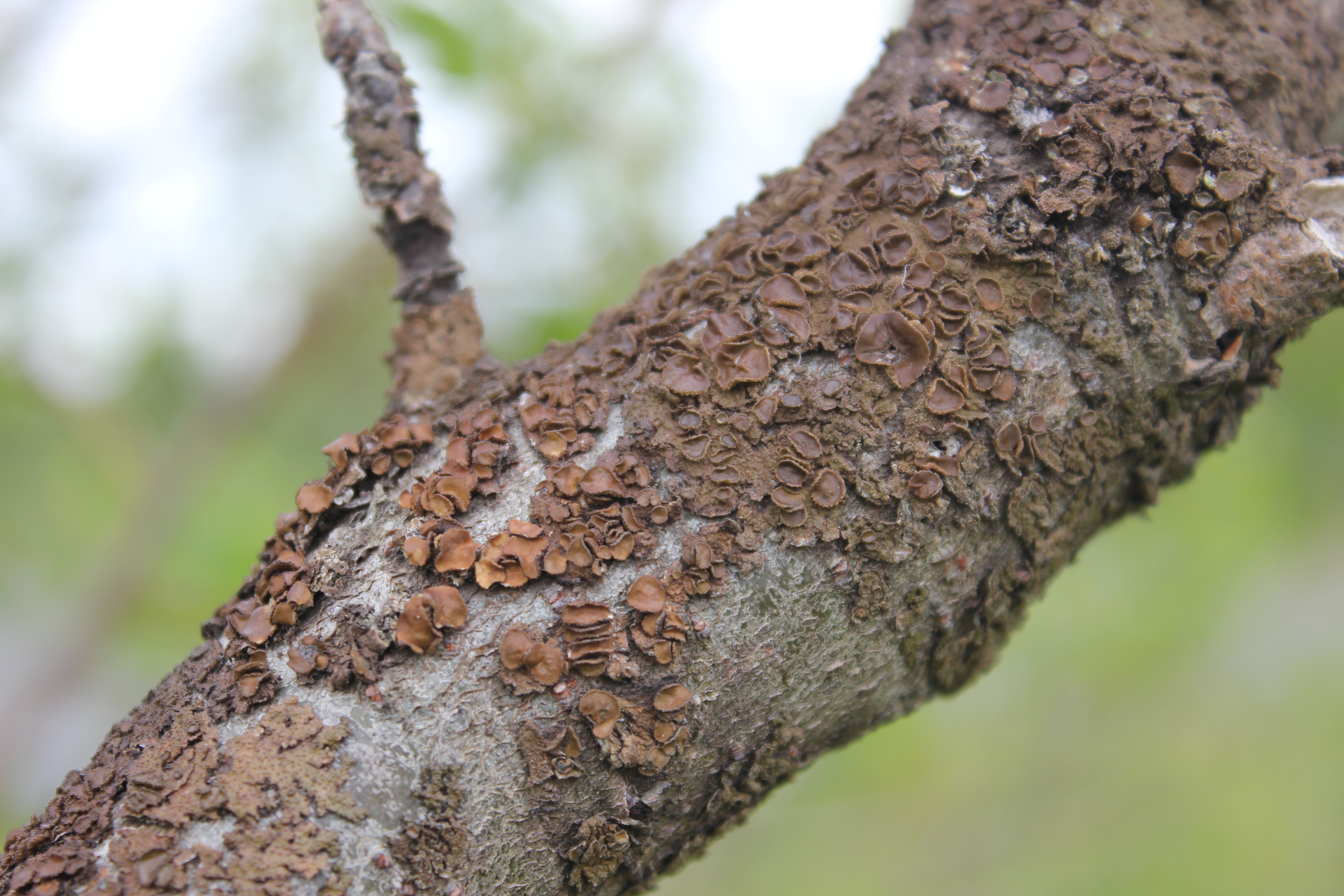
- Melanohalea exasperata

Scientific classification
- Kingdom: Fungi
- Division: Ascomycota
- Class: Lecanoromycetes
- Order: Lecanorales
- Family: Parmeliaceae
- Genus: Melanohalea; O.Blanco, A.Crespo, Divakar, Essl., D.Hawksw. & Lumbsch (2004)

Type species
- Melanohalea exasperata (De Not.) O.Blanco, A.Crespo, Divakar, Essl., D.Hawksw. & Lumbsch (2004)

Species
- see text

= Melanohalea =

Genus of lichen

Melanohalea is a genus of foliose lichens in the family Parmeliaceae. It contains 30 mostly Northern Hemisphere species that grow on bark or on wood. The genus is characterised by the presence of pseudocyphellae (tiny pores that allow for gas exchange), usually on warts or on the tips of isidia, a non-pored epicortex and a medulla containing depsidones or lacking secondary metabolites. Melanohalea was circumscribed in 2004 as a segregate of the morphologically similar genus Melanelia, which was created in 1978 for certain brown Parmelia species. The methods used to estimate the evolutionary history of Melanohalea suggest that its diversification primarily occurred during the Miocene and Pliocene epochs.

Melanohalea species predominantly inhabit bark and wood in the Holarctic, with only a few extending into the Southern Hemisphere and rare occurrences on rocks. Notably, Melanohalea peruviana in the Peruvian Andes and M. mexicana in Mexico represent the genus's limited tropical distribution. The distribution of these lichens, which are sensitive indicators of climate and pollution effects, is largely determined by current ecological and geographical factors. Certain species show vulnerability to climate change and environmental pollutants. Many species of lichenicolous (lichen-dwelling) fungi are known to parasitise the lichen. Several Melanohalea species are listed as endangered or critically endangered on national red lists across Europe, reflecting their varying levels of threat due to habitat loss, pollution, and climate change. Only M. halei has been assessed globally by the IUCN and is listed as being of least concern due to its widespread distribution and stable population.

== Taxonomy ==
Melanohalea was circumscribed in 2004 by the lichenologists Oscar Blanco, Ana Crespo, Pradeep Divakar, Ted Esslinger, David L. Hawksworth and H. Thorsten Lumbsch. It is a segregate of Melanelia, a genus created in 1978 to contain the brown Parmelia species. The circumscription of this genus was questioned later, especially after molecular phylogenetics studies published in 2004 and 2006 demonstrated that it was not monophyletic. Subsequently, two genera, Melanelixia and Melanohalea, were created.

Melanohalea originally comprised 19 species, with M. exasperata serving as the type species. The species transferred to Melanohalea were formerly included in section Vainioellae of genus Melanelia. This section, in turn, was derived from Parmelia subgenus Euparmelia sect. Vainioellae, originally proposed by Vilmos Gyelnik in 1932. Section Vainioellae included "brown parmelioids" with wide, rounded to elongated lobes that were predominantly flat. The "brown parmelioids" refers to Parmelia species lacking atranorin or usnic acid in the cortex, with a dark to medium-brown thallus colour. Molecular phylogenetic analysis has shown that genus Melanohalea is part of the "Melanohalea" clade, a lineage that includes most of the other "brown parmelioids". Other genera in this clade are Emodomelanelia, Melanelixia, Montanelia, and Pleurosticta.

The genus name combines Melanelia with the name of the lichenologist Mason Hale, who, according to the authors, "provided the foundations for subsequent contributions to our knowledge of this family".

== Diversification ==
Methods used to estimate the evolutionary divergence of taxa, including the multispecies coalescent process, suggest that most of the diversification of Melanohalea occurred throughout the Miocene (23.03 million to 5.333 million BP) and Pliocene (5.333 million to 2.58 million BP). Divergence estimates also suggest that although diversification occurred during the glacial cycles of the Pleistocene, it was not accompanied by speciation in Melanohalea.

== Description ==
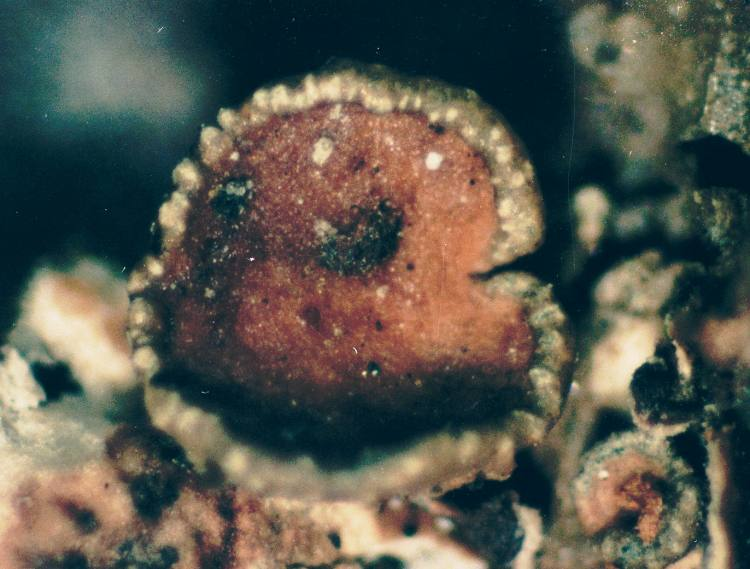
Closeup of apothecium of herbarium specimen of Melanohalea olivacea showing white pseudocyphellae on the margin

Melanohalea lichens have a foliose (leafy) thallus that is loosely to moderately attached to its substrate. The upper size limit of the thallus is about 14 cm (5.5 in) in diameter. The lobes comprising the thallus are flat to concave with rounded tips, lack cilia, and measure 0.5–7 mm wide. The upper surface of the thallus is olive-green to dark brown, ranging in texture from smooth to wrinkled, and lacks spots or stains. It usually features pseudocyphellae on warts or on the tips of isidia; the presence of soredia and isidia is variable. The upper cortex is paraplectenchymatous (a cell arrangement where the hyphae are oriented in all directions), and measures 10–16 mm thick. The epicortex does not have pores, unlike in the related genus Melanelixia. The medulla is white, and the lower thallus surface is smooth and flat and coloured pale brown to black. Rhizines are simple (i.e., unbranched), and the same colour as the lower surface.

The ascomata (fruiting bodies) are apothecial, laminal, and sessile to more or less pedicellate. The apothecial disc is brown, and is not perforated. It is initially concave but becomes convex with age. The amphithecium (a layer of cells that surrounds the apothecium) has pseudocyphellate papillae, without spots or stains. Asci are elongated, club-shaped (clavate), Lecanora-type, and thickened at the tip. They lack an internal apical beak, and have between 8 and 32 spores. Ascospores of Melanohalea are spherical to ovoid or ellipsoid in shape, thin-walled, colourless, and measure 5.5–20 by 4–12.5 μm. The conidiomata are pycnidial, immersed, and laminal. The shape of the conidia ranges from cylindrical to fusiform (spindle-shaped); they are simple (i.e., lacking partitions called septa), colourless, and measure 5–8.5 μm long by 1 μm wide. The photobiont of the lichen is trebouxioid, i.e., resembling or belonging to the green algal genus Trebouxia.

=== Chemistry ===
The cortex of Melanohalea lichens has a brown pigment, but lacks other compounds. All chemical spot tests are negative on the cortex. The medulla either contains depsidones (including fumarprotocetraric, protocetraric, and norstictic acid) or lacks secondary metabolites. Depending on the species, the spot test results on the medulla are K− or K+ (yellow to red), KC− or KC+ (pink), and P− or P+ (red, red-orange, or yellow to orange). M. nilgirica contains the aliphatic compound caperatic acid, which is rare in the brown parmelioid lichens, known only to exist in Melanelia stygia, the type species of Melanelia. For this reason its placement in Melanohalea has been questioned. Cell walls of Melanohalea lichens contain the α-glucan compound isolichenan.

=== Similar genera ===
Melanohalea can be mistaken for certain brown species of Xanthoparmelia, which were previously categorised as Neofuscelia. They can be differentiated by their distinct reactions to nitric acid; brown Xanthoparmelia species typically have a blue-green reaction, whereas Melanohalea shows no reaction. Moreover, the cell wall composition of Melanohalea differs, consisting of isolichenan instead of the Xanthoparmelia-type polysaccharide (lichenan). Pleurosticta, although similar to Melanohalea, is characterised by wider lobes, a network of epicortical pores, and a pigment that turns violet upon reacting with both potassium hydroxide (K) and nitric acid (N). Melanelixia is identified by its pored epicortex and absence of pseudocyphellae, while Melanelia is distinguished by its flat and spread-out pseudocyphellae, as opposed to the raised pseudocyphellae found in Melanohalea.

== Habitat and distribution ==
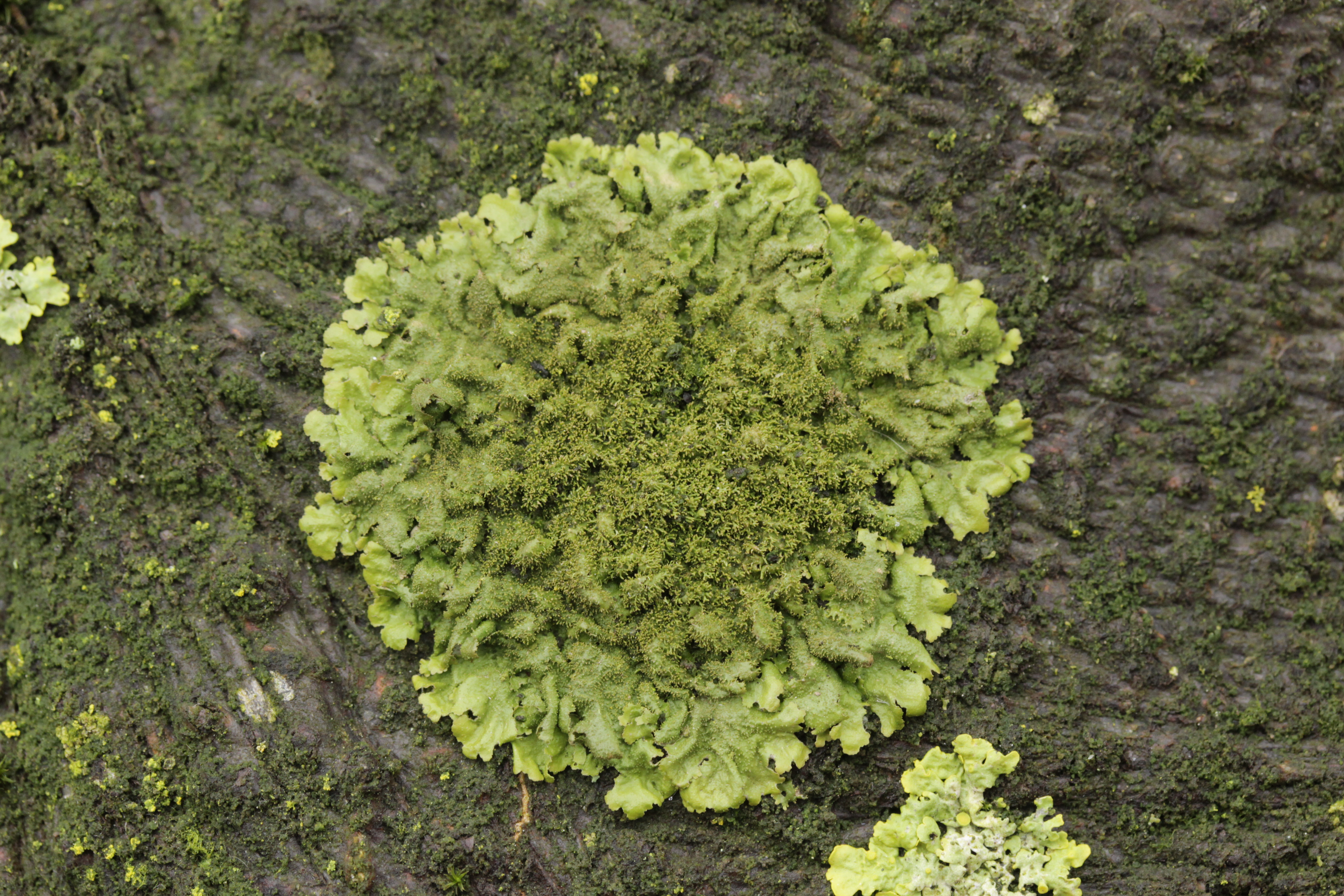
Melanohalea elegantula

Most Melanohalea occur primarily on bark and on wood throughout the Holarctic; only four species occur in the Southern Hemisphere. Occasionally, they are found growing on rock. Melanohalea peruviana is the only species in the genus that has been reported from tropical South America, although it is poorly known – a single collection from an altitude of 4,400 feet (1,300 m) in the Peruvian Andes. The only other Melanohalea species found in a tropical habitat is M. mexicana, a highland species from south central Mexico, and one of three Melanohalea species known to occur in that country. Eight members of the genus are found in China; five in Great Britain and Ireland, and seven occur in the Nordic lichen flora. The five Melanohalea species found in Greenland may play a role in monitoring the impact of climate change, as arctic-alpine lichens are sensitive to fluctuations in the temperature of winter climates, and winter icing events affect lichen-dominated ecosystems. Similarly, a study of the effect of air pollution surrounding the Mongolian capital Ulan Bator showed widespread damage to a variety of lichens (where the thallus was bleached, deformed, or reduced in size), including Melanohalea septentrionalis.

Most Melanohalea species have a broad geographic distribution, although there are a few that have more restricted ranges. Otte and colleagues suggested in a 2005 study that distribution patterns in Melanohalea are largely determined by contemporary ecogeographical factors, and most species have reached their biogeographical limits in the Northern Hemisphere. The distributions of M. elegantula and M. exasperatula seem to be affected by anthropogenic factors, including eutrophication and air pollution. Melanohalea olivacea and M. septentrionalis, both cold-tolerant circumpolar species, have the south-west limit of their distribution range in Switzerland. They are considered relicts of the last ice age and are vulnerable to global climate warming in that country.

== Species interactions ==
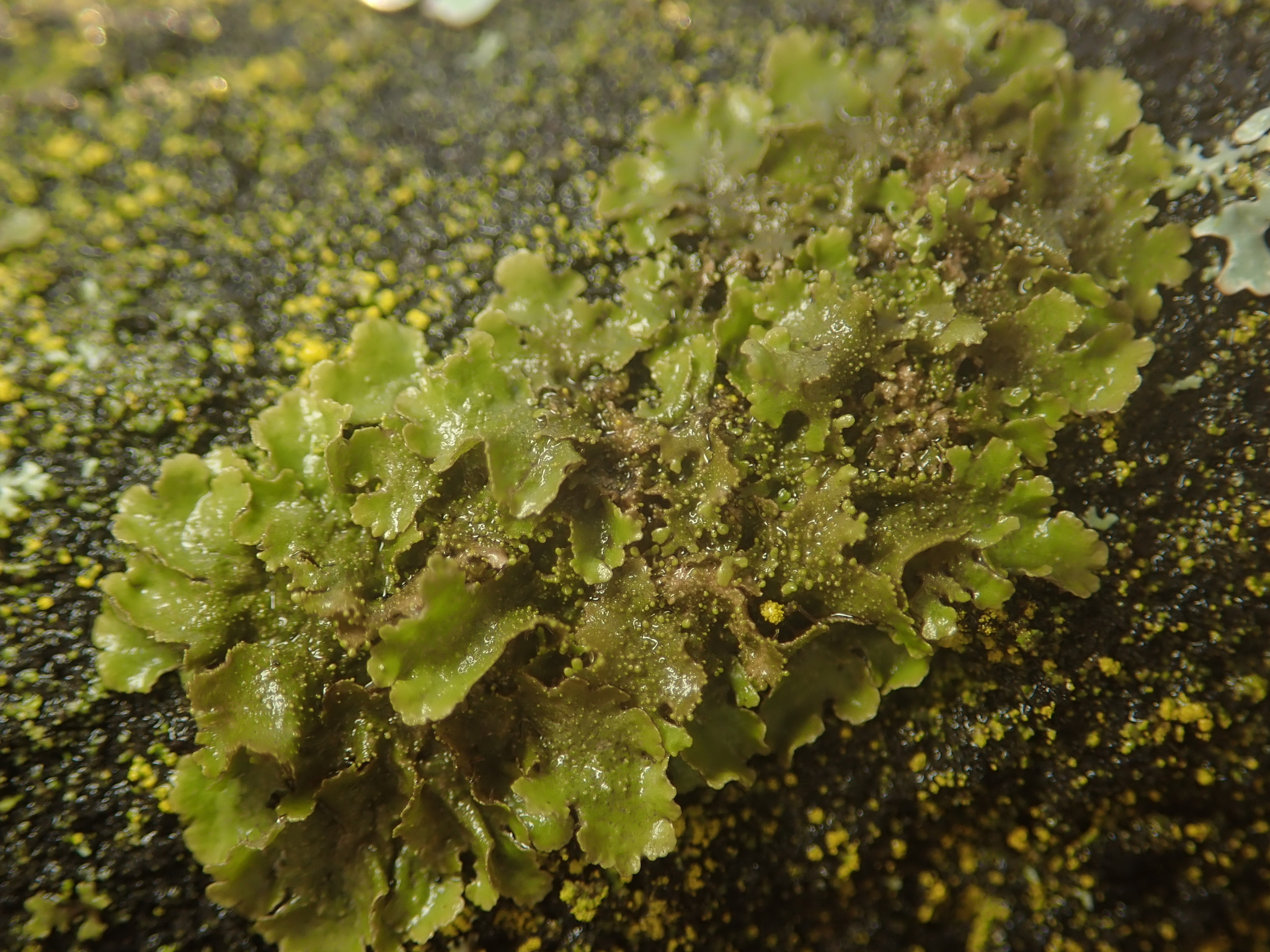
Melanohalea exasperatula

Several species of lichenicolous fungi have been recorded growing on Melanohalea species. These include Epithamnolia xanthoriae, Xenonectriella septemseptata, Plectocarpon melanohaleae (on M. ushuaiensis), Abrothallus bertianus, Zwackhiomyces melanohaleae (on M. exasperata), Phoma melanohaleicola (on M. exasperata), Didymocyrtis consimilis, Stigmidium exasperatum (on M. exasperata), Sphaeropezia melaneliae (on M. olivacea), Arthrorhaphis olivaceae (on M. olivacea), Epithamnolia xanthoriae, Xenonectriella septemseptata, Plectocarpon melanohaleae (on M. ushuaiensis), and Stagonospora exasperatulae (on M. exasperatula). Crittendenia coppinsii (on M. exasperatula), Recent revisions of the poorly known genus lichenicolous Crittendenia (Pucciniomycotina) revealed Crittendenia coppinsii (on M. exasperatula) and C. crassitunicata (on M. ushuaiensis) as parasites of the genus.

== Conservation ==
Melanohalea septentrionalis is listed as endangered on the Red List of Switzerland. Melanohalea exasperata is on the German national Red List, and is in the critically endangered category in Poland's Red list of extinct and vulnerable lichens of Poland. Although M. olivacea was left off this list over uncertainties about its taxonomic status, it has been preliminarily assessed as critically endangered in Switzerland using the IUCN Red List criteria. It has received the same assessment in the neighbouring countries Germany and France. M. elegantula is red-listed in Sweden. Melanohalea halei is the only species in this genus that has been assessed for the global IUCN Red List. Because of its broad geographic distribution, breadth of ecological niches, and large, stable population size, it has been assessed as a least-concern species.

== Species ==
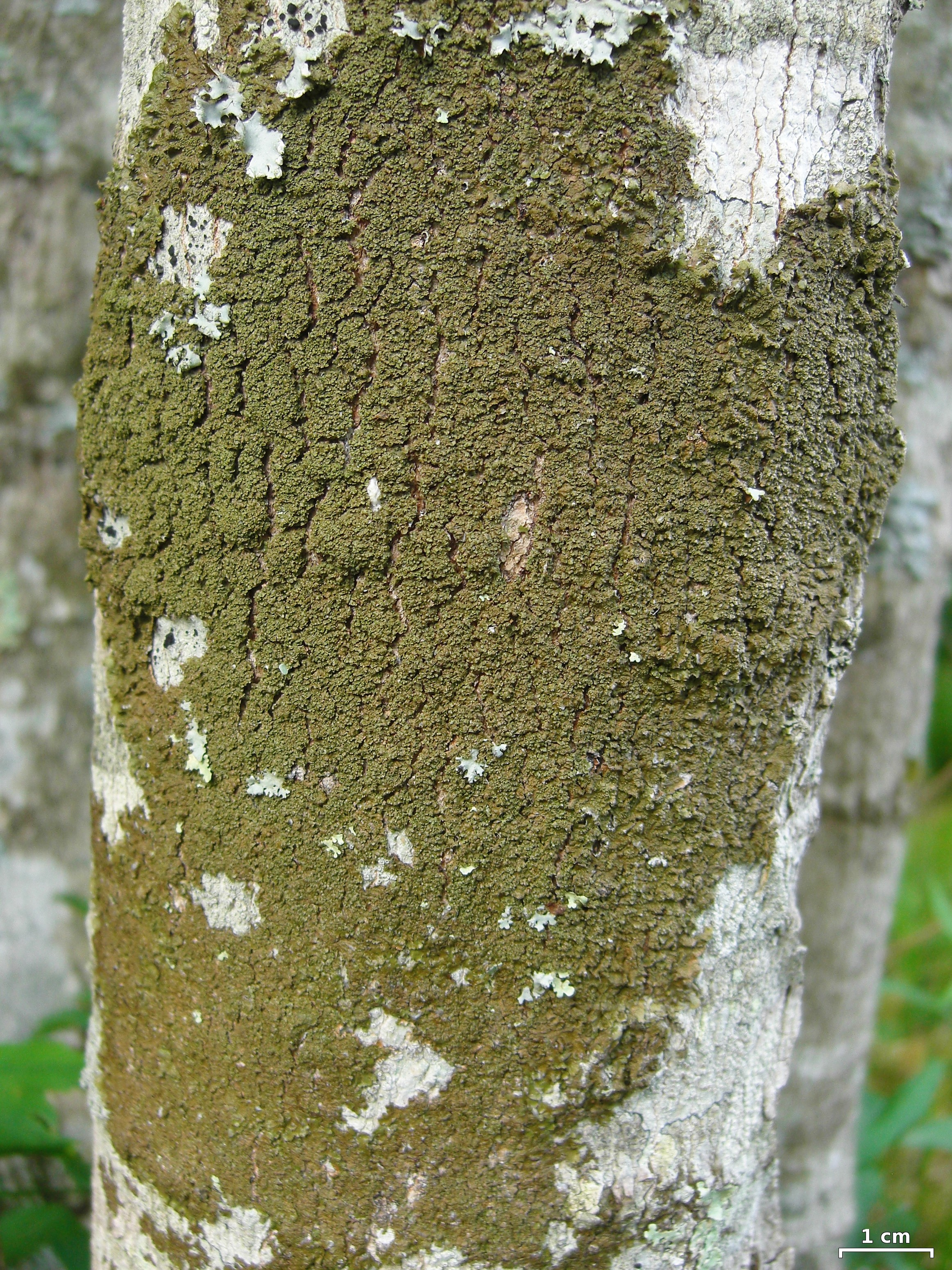
Melanohalea halei

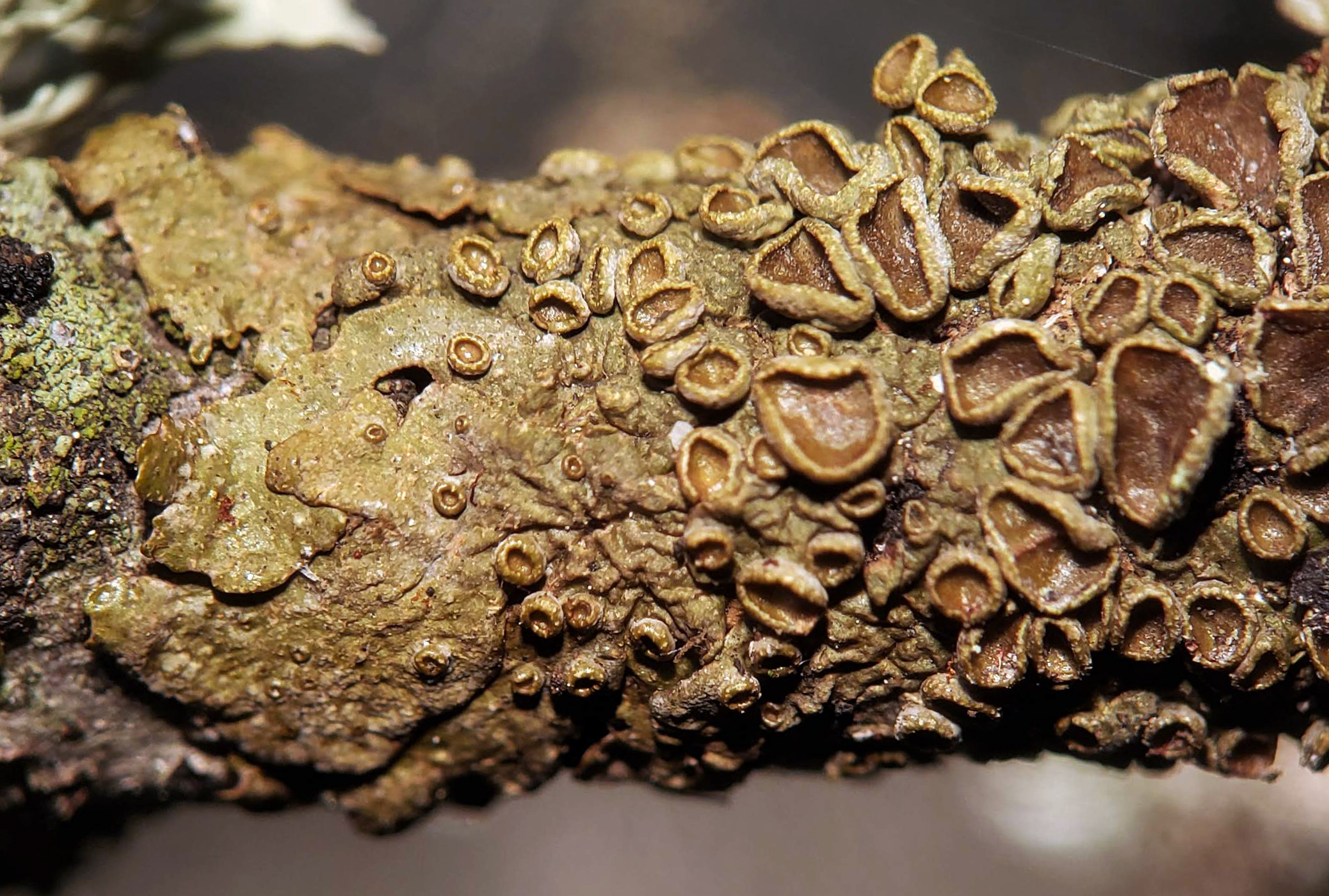
Melanohalea subolivacea

Melanohalea originally included 19 species transferred from Melanelia. In the following years, new species in the genus were described from India, Tibet, Mexico, and Peru. In 2016, Leavitt and colleagues used genetic analyses to help identify six previously undescribed morphologically cryptic species in Melanohalea. As of January 2025, Species Fungorum accepts 30 species of Melanohalea.

- Melanohalea austroamericana Essl., Divakar, A.Crespo, S.D.Leav. & Lumbsch (2016)
- Melanohalea beringiana S.D.Leav., Essl., Divakar, A.Crespo & Lumbsch (2016)
- Melanohalea clairi S.D.Leav., Essl., Divakar, A.Crespo & Lumbsch (2016)
- Melanohalea columbiana S.D.Leav., Essl., Divakar, A.Crespo & Lumbsch (2016)
- Melanohalea davidii S.D.Leav., Essl., Divakar, A.Crespo & Lumbsch (2016)
- Melanohalea elegantula (Zahlbr.) O.Blanco, A.Crespo, Divakar, Essl., D.Hawksw. & Lumbsch (2004)
- Melanohalea exasperata (De Not.) O.Blanco, A.Crespo, Divakar, Essl., D.Hawksw. & Lumbsch (2004)
- Melanohalea exasperatula (Nyl.) O.Blanco, A.Crespo, Divakar, Essl., D.Hawksw. & Lumbsch (2004)
- Melanohalea gomukhensis (Divakar, Upreti & Elix) O.Blanco, A.Crespo, Divakar, Essl., D.Hawksw. & Lumbsch (2004)
- Melanohalea halei (Ahti) O.Blanco, A.Crespo, Divakar, Essl., D.Hawksw. & Lumbsch (2004)
- Melanohalea inactiva (P.M.Jørg.) O.Blanco, A.Crespo, Divakar, Essl., D.Hawksw. & Lumbsch (2004)
- Melanohalea infumata (Nyl.) O.Blanco, A.Crespo, Divakar, Essl., D.Hawksw. & Lumbsch (2004)
- Melanohalea laciniatula (Flagey ex H.Olivier) O.Blanco, A.Crespo, Divakar, Essl., D.Hawksw. & Lumbsch (2004)
- Melanohalea lobulata F.G.Meng & H.Y.Wang (2009) – Tibet
- Melanohalea mexicana Essl. & R.-E.Pérez (2010) – Mexico
- Melanohalea multispora (A.Schneid.) O.Blanco, A.Crespo, Divakar, Essl., D.Hawksw. & Lumbsch (2004)
- Melanohalea nilgirica Divakar & Upreti (2005) – India
- Melanohalea olivacea (L.) O.Blanco, A.Crespo, Divakar, Essl., D.Hawksw. & Lumbsch (2004)
- Melanohalea olivaceoides (Krog) O.Blanco, A.Crespo, Divakar, Essl., D.Hawksw. & Lumbsch (2004)
- Melanohalea peruviana Essl. (2012) – Peru
- Melanohalea poeltii (Essl.) O.Blanco, A.Crespo, Divakar, Essl., D.Hawksw. & Lumbsch (2004) – Nepal; India
- Melanohalea septentrionalis (Lynge) O.Blanco, A.Crespo, Divakar, Essl., D.Hawksw. & Lumbsch (2004) – North America; Europe; Asia
- Melanohalea subelegantula (Essl.) O.Blanco, A.Crespo, Divakar, Essl., D.Hawksw. & Lumbsch (2004) – western North America; Tibet
- Melanohalea subexasperata F.G.Meng & H.Y.Wang (2010) – Tibet
- Melanohalea subolivacea (Nyl. ex Hasse) O.Blanco, A.Crespo, Divakar, Essl., D.Hawksw. & Lumbsch (2004)
- Melanohalea subverruculifera (J.C.Wei & Y.M.Jiang) O.Blanco, A.Crespo, Divakar, Essl., D.Hawksw. & Lumbsch (2004)
- Melanohalea tahltan S.D.Leav., Essl., Divakar, A.Crespo & Lumbsch (2016)
- Melanohalea trabeculata (Ahti) O.Blanco, A.Crespo, Divakar, Essl., D.Hawksw. & Lumbsch (2004)
- Melanohalea ushuaiensis (Zahlbr.) O.Blanco, A.Crespo, Divakar, Essl., D.Hawksw. & Lumbsch (2004)
- Melanohalea zopheroa (Essl.) O.Blanco, A.Crespo, Divakar, Essl., D.Hawksw. & Lumbsch (2004)
