= Melanohalea subverruculifera =

Scientific classification
- Domain: Eukaryota
- Kingdom: Fungi
- Division: Ascomycota
- Class: Lecanoromycetes
- Order: Lecanorales
- Family: Parmeliaceae
- Genus: Melanohalea
- Species: M. subverruculifera

Binomial name
- Melanohalea subverruculifera (J.C.Wei & Y.M.Jiang) O.Blanco, A.Crespo, Divakar, Essl., D.Hawksw. & Lumbsch (2004)

Synonyms
- Parmelia subverruculifera J.C.Wei & Y.M.Jiang (1980); Melanelia subverruculifera (J.C.Wei & Y.M.Jiang) J.C.Wei (1991)

Species of lichen in the family Parmeliaceae

Melanohalea subverruculifera is a species of lichen in the family Parmeliaceae. Found in China, it was first formally described as a new species in 1980 as Parmelia subverruculifera. It was transferred to the segregate genus Melanelia in 1991, and then to the genus Melanohalea in 2004.
