= Melanohalea gomukhensis =

Scientific classification
- Kingdom: Fungi
- Division: Ascomycota
- Class: Lecanoromycetes
- Order: Lecanorales
- Family: Parmeliaceae
- Genus: Melanohalea
- Species: M. gomukhensis

Binomial name
- Melanohalea gomukhensis (Divakar, Upreti & Elix) O.Blanco, A.Crespo, Divakar, Essl., D.Hawksw. & Lumbsch (2004)

Synonyms
- Melanelia gomukhensis Divakar, Upreti & Elix (2001)

Species of lichen

Melanohalea gomukhensis is a species of corticolous (bark-dwelling) foliose lichen in the family Parmeliaceae. It is found in northern India.

== Taxonomy ==
The lichen was described as a new species in 2001 by the lichenologists Pradeep Divakar, Dalip Kumar Upreti, and John Elix. The type specimen was collected by Dharani Dhar Awasthi and Shri Ram Singh (collection number 8343B) on 30 June 1976, and is housed in the lichen herbarium at AWAS (Awasthi Herbarium, Lucknow University, India). The species name gomukhensis refers to Gomukh, the geographical location in the Uttarkashi district of Uttarakhand, India, where the type was collected. The authors originally classified the taxon in the genus Melanelia. It was reclassified as a member of the segregate genus Melanohalea in 2004.

The species is related to Melanohalea poeltii from Nepal, but differs in having dense pseudocyphellae (small pores in the upper cortex) and structures that develop from granular soredia (powdery reproductive propagules) contained within the cavity of the pseudocyphella. While M. poeltii has sparse or absent pseudocyphellae on some lobes, and its isidia (coral-like outgrowths) develop on small, more or less spherical papillae, with the isidia being cylindrical to irregular and becoming branched.

== Description ==
Melanelia gomukhensis has a foliose (leafty) thallus that grows up to 9 cm wide. Its lobes are contiguous to weakly imbricate (touching or slightly overlapping), irregular, irregularly branched, and 2–3 mm wide with subrotund (somewhat rounded) apices. The upper thallus surface is red-brown to dark brown, flat or weakly concave, smooth, shiny at the apices but dull within, and emaculate (without spots). The species lacks isidia (finger-like outgrowths) but is densely pseudocyphellate. These pseudocyphellae are laminal (on the surface), fleck-like and whitish at first, but soon darken and expand, becoming rounded or irregular, and eventually sorediate (developing powdery reproductive structures).

The soredia are coarse and granular, becoming partly corticate (developing a protective outer layer) and forming pseudoisidia (structures resembling isidia but with a different origin). These pseudoisidia are globose (spherical) in shape and develop from granular soredia contained within the cavity of the pseudocyphella, which is a distinctive characteristic of this species.

The medulla (inner layer) is white. The lower surface is shiny, minutely wrinkled, black but dark brown at the margins. The rhizines (root-like structures on the lower surface) are sparse to moderately dense, simple, and brown to dark brown. Both apothecia (cup-like reproductive structures) and pycnidia (flask-shaped structures) are absent in the specimens examined, indicating that the species reproduces primarily through vegetative means via soredia.

== Habitat and distribution ==
At the time of its original publication, Melanelia gomukhensis was known only from its type locality in northern India. The type specimen was collected in the Uttarkashi district of Uttarakhand (formerly part of Uttar Pradesh), India, specifically on the way to Gomukh, 10 km from Gangotri, at an elevation of about 3,475 m (11,401 ft). It was found growing on bark.
