= Melanohalea columbiana =

Scientific classification
- Kingdom: Fungi
- Division: Ascomycota
- Class: Lecanoromycetes
- Order: Lecanorales
- Family: Parmeliaceae
- Genus: Melanohalea
- Species: M. columbiana

Binomial name
- Melanohalea columbiana S.Leavitt, Essl., Divakar, A.Crespo & Lumbsch (2016)

Species of lichen

Melanohalea columbiana is a species of foliose lichen in the family Parmeliaceae. It was described as a new species in 2016. The type was collected at the Rock Creek (Palouse River tributary) of the Channeled Scablands, where it was found growing on a species of hawthorne. The specific epithet columbiana refers to its occurrence in the Columbia River drainage basin and Columbian Plateau. The lichen has been recorded from Idaho, Washington, Central Oregon, and a single locale in the Peninsular Ranges in Southern California. It is morphologically similar to Melanohalea multispora, but is genetically distinct from that species.
