= Melanohalea beringiana =

Scientific classification
- Kingdom: Fungi
- Division: Ascomycota
- Class: Lecanoromycetes
- Order: Lecanorales
- Family: Parmeliaceae
- Genus: Melanohalea
- Species: M. beringiana

Binomial name
- Melanohalea beringiana S.Leavitt, Essl., Divakar, A.Crespo & Lumbsch (2016)

Species of lichen

Melanohalea beringiana is a species of foliose lichen in the family Parmeliaceae. It was described as a new species in 2016. The type was collected near the Richardson Highway, north of Paxson, Alaska, where it was found growing on the bark of a trunk of balsam poplar. The specific epithet beringiana refers to its Alaskan distribution. It is morphologically similar to Melanohalea olivaceoides, but is genetically distinct from that species.
