= Melanohalea tahltan =

Scientific classification
- Kingdom: Fungi
- Division: Ascomycota
- Class: Lecanoromycetes
- Order: Lecanorales
- Family: Parmeliaceae
- Genus: Melanohalea
- Species: M. tahltan

Binomial name
- Melanohalea tahltan S.D.Leav., Essl., Divakar, A.Crespo & Lumbsch (2016)

Species of lichen

Melanohalea tahltan is a species of foliose lichen in the family Parmeliaceae. It was described as a new species in 2016. The species name honours the indigenous Tahltan people that live in northern regions of the Canadian province British Columbia.

The type was found along the Cassiar Highway, south of Kinaskan Lake, where it was growing on the bark of Salix. It has also been found in Thompson Plateau in southern British Columbia. Melanohalea tahltan is morphologically similar to Melanohalea multispora, but is genetically distinct from that species.
