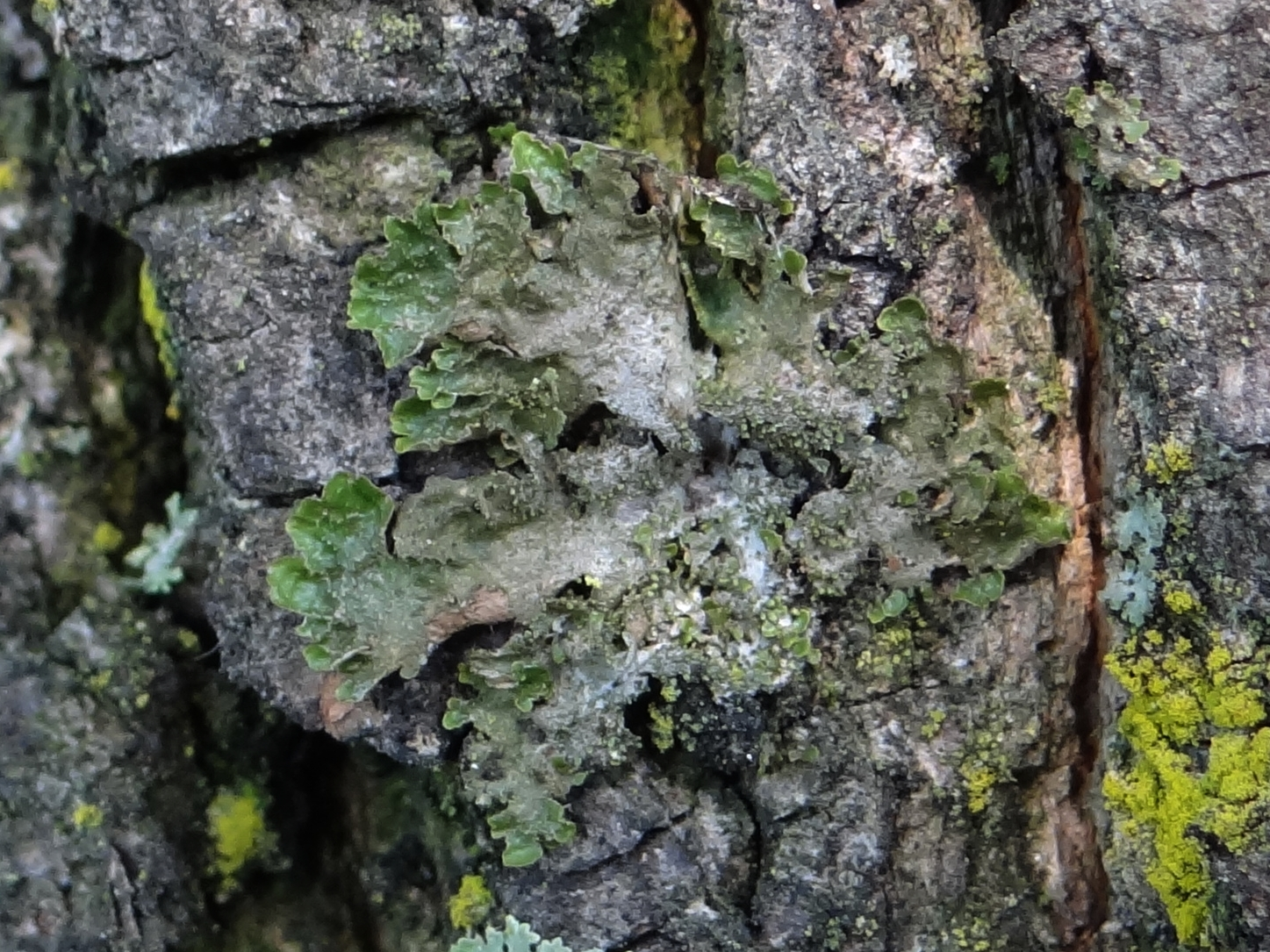

Conservation status
- Secure (NatureServe)

Scientific classification
- Kingdom: Fungi
- Division: Ascomycota
- Class: Lecanoromycetes
- Order: Lecanorales
- Family: Parmeliaceae
- Genus: Melanohalea
- Species: M. elegantula

Binomial name
- Melanohalea elegantula (Zahlbr.) O.Blanco, A.Crespo, Divakar, Essl., D.Hawksw. & Lumbsch (2004)

Synonyms
- Parmelia aspidota var. elegantula Zahlbr. (1894); Parmelia elegantula (Zahlbr.) Szatala (1930); Melanelia elegantula (Zahlbr.) Essl. (1978)

= Melanohalea elegantula =

Species of lichen-forming fungus

Melanohalea elegantula, commonly known as the elegant camouflage lichen, is a species of foliose lichen in the family Parmeliaceae. It was first described by Alexander Zahlbruckner in 1894 as Parmelia aspidota var. elegantula. Hungarian lichenologist Ödön Szatala promoted it to full species status, as Parmelia elegantula, in 1930. Theodore Esslinger transferred it to the genus Melanelia in 1978. Finally, it was assigned to the newly circumscribed genus Melanohalea in 2004.
