= Melanohalea trabeculata =

Scientific classification
- Domain: Eukaryota
- Kingdom: Fungi
- Division: Ascomycota
- Class: Lecanoromycetes
- Order: Lecanorales
- Family: Parmeliaceae
- Genus: Melanohalea
- Species: M. trabeculata

Binomial name
- Melanohalea trabeculata (Ahti) O.Blanco, A.Crespo, Divakar, Essl., D.Hawksw. & Lumbsch (2004)

Synonyms
- Parmelia trabeculata Ahti (1966); Melanelia trabeculata (Ahti) Essl. (1978)

Species of lichen in the family Parmeliaceae

Melanohalea trabeculata is a species of foliose lichen in the family Parmeliaceae. It was first formally described by Finnish lichenologist Teuvo Ahti in 1966 as Parmelia trabeculata. Ted Esslinger transferred the species to the new genus Melanelia in 1978, which he circumscribed to contain the brown parmeliae species. In 2004, it was moved to the newly circumscribed genus Melanohalea.

Ahti collected the type in the Cochrane District of Ontario, Canada, on the west end of Martison Lake. There he found it growing on the trunk of a large willow tree on the lake shore. He suggested that it is a strictly North American species with a transcontinental boreal range.
