= Melanohalea ushuaiensis =

Scientific classification
- Kingdom: Fungi
- Division: Ascomycota
- Class: Lecanoromycetes
- Order: Lecanorales
- Family: Parmeliaceae
- Genus: Melanohalea
- Species: M. ushuaiensis

Binomial name
- Melanohalea ushuaiensis (Zahlbr.) O.Blanco, A.Crespo, Divakar, Essl., D.Hawksw. & Lumbsch (2004)

Synonyms
- Parmelia ushuaiensis Zahlbr. (1917); Melanelia ushuaiensis (Zahlbr.) Essl. (1978)

Species of lichen in the family Parmeliaceae

Melanohalea ushuaiensis is a species of lichen in the family Parmeliaceae. It was first formally described in 1917 by Alexander Zahlbruckner as Parmelia ushuaiensis. Ted Esslinger transferred to the new genus Melanelia in 1978, which he circumscribed to contain the brown parmeliae species. In 2004, it was moved to the newly created genus Melanohalea. It is endemic to South America.
