= Xanthoparmelia salazinica =

Scientific classification
- Domain: Eukaryota
- Kingdom: Fungi
- Division: Ascomycota
- Class: Lecanoromycetes
- Order: Lecanorales
- Family: Parmeliaceae
- Genus: Xanthoparmelia
- Species: X. salazinica

Binomial name
- Xanthoparmelia salazinica (Hale) G.Amo, A.Crespo, Elix & Lumbsch (2010)

Synonyms
- Karoowia salazinica Hale (1989)

Species of lichen

Xanthoparmelia salazinica is a species of lichen in the family Parmeliaceae. Found in South Africa, it was described as a new species in 1989 by American lichenologist Mason Hale. He classified it in Karoowia, a genus that has since been placed in synonymy with Xanthoparmelia following molecular phylogenetic analysis published in 2010.

The type specimen was collected by Hale in near Middelpos (Cape Province); here it was found growing in low sandstone ridges in karoo. The specific epithet refers to the presence of salazinic acid, the main secondary compound found in the lichen. It also has consalazinic acid and usnic acid.

== See also ==
- List of Xanthoparmelia species
