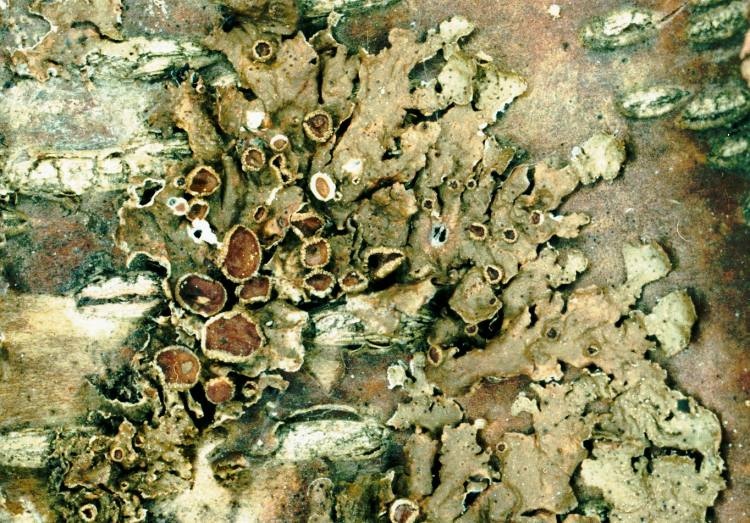

Conservation status
- Secure (NatureServe)

Scientific classification
- Kingdom: Fungi
- Division: Ascomycota
- Class: Lecanoromycetes
- Order: Lecanorales
- Family: Parmeliaceae
- Genus: Melanohalea
- Species: M. olivacea

Binomial name
- Melanohalea olivacea (L.) O.Blanco, A.Crespo, Divakar, Essl., D.Hawksw. & Lumbsch (2004)

Synonyms
- List: Lichen olivaceus L. (1753); Parmelia olivacea (L.) Ach. (1803); Imbricaria olivacea (L.) DC. (1805); Platysma olivaceum (L.) Frege (1812); Platisma olivaceum (L.) Frege (1812); Melanelia olivacea (L.) Essl. (1978)

= Melanohalea olivacea =

Species of lichen-forming fungus

Melanohalea olivacea, the spotted camouflage lichen or spotted brown shield, is a species of brown foliose lichen in the family Parmeliaceae. It forms rounded, olive-brown to dark brown patches (rosettes) that are typically 5–8 centimetres across on tree bark, particularly on birches in boreal forests and mountain woodlands. The lichen is distinguished by small pale spots called pseudocyphellae scattered across its upper surface and a black lower surface with dark rhizines (root-like attachment threads). Originally described by Carl Linnaeus in 1753 as Lichen olivaceus, the species was moved through several genera before DNA-based phylogenetic studies in 2004 placed it in the newly created genus Melanohalea. In that genus, it is recognized as distinct from similar brown species based on both genetic data and physical characteristics.

Melanohalea olivacea has an almost circumpolar distribution (around the high latitudes of the Northern Hemisphere) across the Northern Hemisphere's boreal zone, occurring throughout Scandinavia and other parts of northern Europe, as well as North America, and parts of Asia, though it becomes rare towards more southerly temperate regions. The species is known for forming a clear upper boundary on trunks, sometimes called the "olivacea line", which matches the maximum winter snow depth in subarctic birch forests, a pattern long used as a natural indicator of snow depth in Scandinavian mountains. Its height on the trunk is strongly controlled by how long snow covers the bark, and it is sensitive to prolonged ice encapsulation during mild winters. Changes in snow cover and winter icing have been discussed as factors that could affect its local abundance and vertical position on trunks. Although globally secure, the species is listed as critically endangered in Germany and regionally extinct in the Czech Republic, where threats include nutrient enrichment of habitats (eutrophication) and changes in forestry and agricultural land use.

== Taxonomy ==
Melanohalea olivacea was originally described by Carl Linnaeus in 1753 as Lichen olivaceus, which he characterized as an olive-tinged foliose lichen with overlapping lobes (imbricate) with smooth, shiny lobes divided into many blunt segments that broaden towards their tips. Linnaeus also remarked that it could appear crust-like when growing attached to trees, and he gave its habitat as European rocks, but also noted that it can grow on both trees and rocks. He linked the name to earlier published accounts and illustrations describing the lichen as having relatively large, warty, shield-like fruiting bodies (apothecia). Erik Acharius later transferred the species to the genus Parmelia as Parmelia olivacea in 1803. In his brief diagnosis (short formal description), he described a thin, star-like thallus (lichen body) that is glossy olive-brown, with a more wrinkled, folded centre and flat lobes that broaden into rounded tips with small lobules. He also described the apothecia ("scutellae") as roughly the same colour as the thallus with a margin that is rolled inward and finely scalloped (crenulate), and he recorded it chiefly from tree trunks while noting substantial variation and distinguishing named forms occurring on old willow stems as well as on rocks and bark.

In his monographic treatment of bark-dwelling brown Parmelia species that lack isidia or soredia (two common asexual propagules) of the Northern Hemisphere, Teuvo Ahti retained the species in Parmelia and provided a detailed modern circumscription of P. olivacea. Both Ahti and later authors emphasized that the name olivacea had long been used in an overly broad sense for a mixed set of similar-looking brown parmelioid lichens differing in substrate, morphology, and reproductive structures. William Nylander was the first to restrict the name Parmelia olivacea sensu stricto (in the strict sense) to a non-isidiate, non-sorediate corticolous species bearing pseudocyphellae on the lobes. Bernt Lynge subsequently segregated Parmelia septentrionalis from P. olivacea in 1912, based on a combination of morphological and anatomical characters including the scarcity of pseudocyphellae, smaller spores, and a thinner subhymenium. Ahti accepted P. septentrionalis as a distinct species, citing the frequent occurrence of mixed populations without convincing intermediates as evidence against infraspecific rank.

At the generic level, Theodore Esslinger removed the brown Parmelia species from Parmelia sensu lato and placed P. olivacea in the genus Melanelia as Melanelia olivacea. Subsequent molecular phylogenetics studies showed that Melanelia, as then defined, grouped species from more than one evolutionary line (polyphyletic). As a result, Blanco and colleagues segregated two new genera, Melanelixia and Melanohalea, using phylogenetic analyses based on several genes (multilocus) supported by morphological and chemical characters. In their analyses, M. olivacea grouped with M. septentrionalis and related taxa in a distinct clade (a single branch on the phylogenetic tree), which they assigned to the newly described genus Melanohalea. The genus Melanohalea was characterized as comprising brown, foliose lichens with pseudocyphellate upper surfaces and medullary chemistry dominated by depsidones or, in some species, lacking detectable secondary metabolites. The currently accepted name, Melanohalea olivacea, was published in 2004 in the journal Mycological Research. Index Fungorum and Species Fungorum list the 2004 name as the current accepted combination and list earlier names based on the same original type as homotypic synonyms. Ahti selected a type specimen (lectotype) from Linnaean material; later work designated a replacement type from Härjedalen, Sweden, to stabilize name usage. More recent work has shown that DNA barcoding using the ITS region (a commonly used fungal barcode) can reliably distinguish Melanohalea olivacea from other brown parmelioid lichens, including morphologically similar taxa. In a Greenland-focused barcode dataset, species concepts based on morphology were recovered as well-supported, monophyletic clades (groups that include all descendants of a common ancestor), supporting the use of molecular data for accurate identification in this group. A later multilocus phylogeny based on molecular markers from ribosomal, mitochondrial, and protein-coding genes recovered Melanohalea olivacea as a well-supported lineage within Melanohalea and placed it in the same major clade as the apotheciate species M. halei and M. septentrionalis. In that study, previously unrecognized species-level lineages were detected in several other Melanohalea taxa, but no additional lineages were reported within M. olivacea.

=== Common names ===
In North America, Melanohalea olivacea has been referred to by the common names 'spotted camouflage lichen' and 'spotted brown shield'. In northern Europe, a number of local names reflect its colour, where it grows, or its ecology: Danish olivenbrun skållav ('olive-brown shield lichen'), Finnish koivunruskokarve ('birch brown fuzz', referring to its occurrence on birch bark), Norwegian snömållav ('snow-mark lichen'), and Swedish snömärkeslav ('snow-marker lichen'), the latter two referring to its tendency to form a distinct upper boundary on tree trunks at the typical winter snow line.

== Description ==
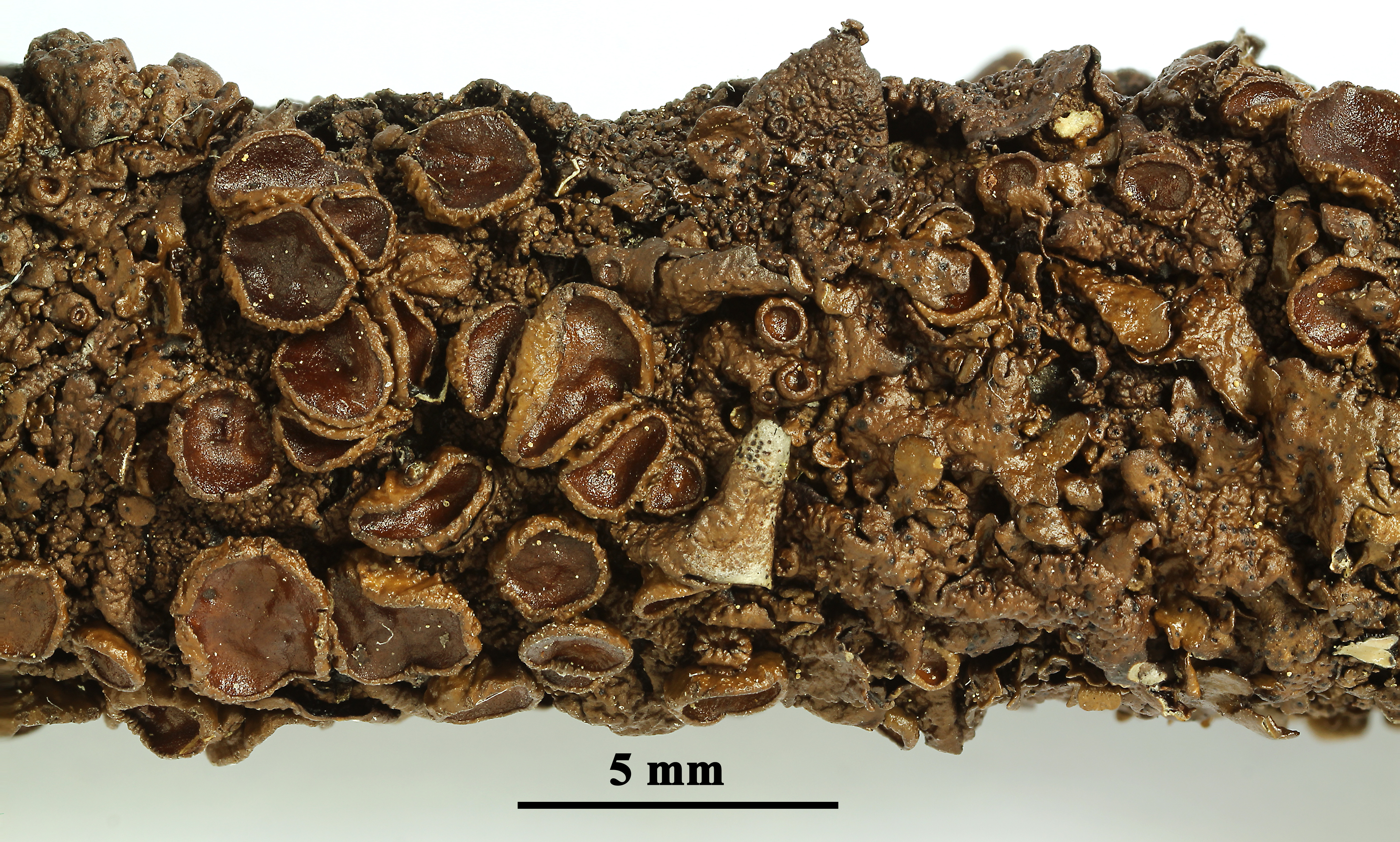
Melanohalea olivacea with numerous apothecia on birch (Betula) in Härjedalen, Sweden; scale bar: 5 mm

Melanohalea olivacea is a brown, foliose lichen that forms rounded rosettes, commonly about 5–8 cm across and sometimes reaching around 10 cm in diameter. The thallus is typically closely attached to the surface it grows on (the substrate) and divided into fairly broad lobes (the leaf-like divisions of the thallus), usually 2–5 mm wide, which can appear wavy or folded, especially towards the centre of older rosettes. Its upper surface ranges from olive-green to dark brown and is often dull in the central parts, while the outer lobes may look slightly shinier. The species typically lacks isidia and soredia (two common asexual propagules in lichens). Small, pale pseudocyphellae usually appear as small dot-like (punctiform spots, mainly on the lobe surface, and are easiest to see near the margins. The lower surface is typically black, with a narrow brown rim near the margins that lacks rhizines, and it bears dense, dark rhizines that are mostly simple (occasionally sparsely branched).

Apothecia are common in mature thalli and are usually concentrated towards the centre rather than extending across the outer lobes. They are generally a few millimetres wide, with a dark brown disc and a raised margin that tends to become strongly crenulate and often pseudocyphellate as it ages. In cross-section, the spore-producing layer (hymenium) is hyaline (colourless) with a relatively thick subhymenium, and the ascospores are hyaline and ovoid to ellipsoid, typically around 12–17 × 7–11 μm in size (with some variation). Pycnidia are often present as small dark points on the upper surface and produce very small asexual spores (conidia). Chemical spot tests are typically PD+ (red) reaction with K−, C− and KC−, consistent with fumarprotocetraric-type depsidones (often with only traces of protocetraric acid, and atranorin variably reported).

=== Similar species ===
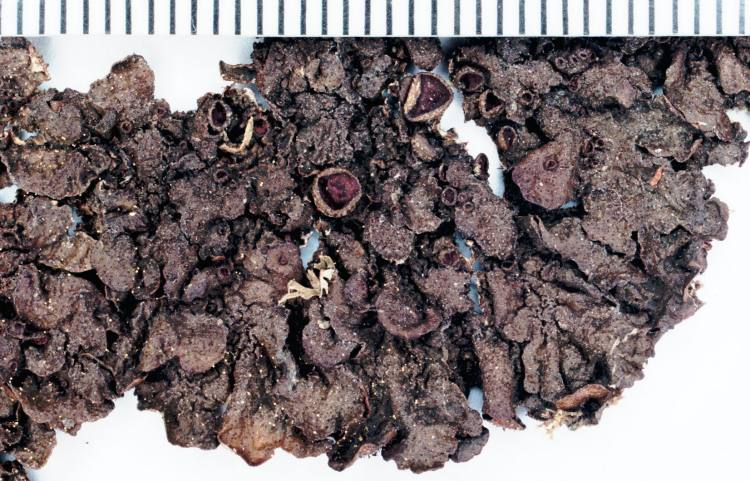
Melanohalea septentrionalis is a lookalike

Melanohalea septentrionalis is the species most often confused with M. olivacea, and much of the older comparative literature (including Ahti's monograph) discussed both taxa under Parmelia, even though they are now placed in Melanohalea. The most dependable external distinction is the pseudocyphellae: in M. olivacea they are usually dot-like and mostly on the lobe surface (often easiest to see near the thallus periphery), whereas in M. septentrionalis they are more elongate to irregular in shape and are largely confined to the lobe margins, which commonly look slightly swollen and "eroded". On average, M. septentrionalis also tends to form smaller rosettes (often up to about 5 cm) with a shinier upper surface, and it commonly has more densely crowded, smaller apothecia that can extend much further towards the thallus margin than in M. olivacea. Because brown parmelioid lichens can be difficult to identify using appearance alone in harsh Arctic environments, Leavitt and colleagues recommended molecular barcoding (and, where needed, thin-layer chromatography) to confirm identifications in morphologically ambiguous material.

When thalli are poorly developed and the external characters become less clear, anatomical measurements provide a more reliable separation: M. septentrionalis has smaller spores and a thinner subhymenium than M. olivacea, and these two variables (especially subhymenium height and spore length) were found to discriminate reliably between the species in Truong et al.'s analyses. In western North America, Ahti also treated a superficially similar taxon as Parmelia subolivacea (now Melanohalea subolivacea), which can resemble M. olivacea in general habit but differs chemically by lacking the PD+ (red) reaction and often has few or no laminal pseudocyphellae. Ahti further distinguished Parmelia glabra (now Melanelixia glabra) from M. olivacea by its C+ (red) reaction (lecanoric acid chemistry in his account), a minutely hairy upper surface, and the absence of pseudocyphellae, which together help separate it from the punctiform, pseudocyphellate M. olivacea even when both occur on bark. Within the Holarctic, the species occurs in both western and eastern parts of the Holarctic, but is scarce in strongly oceanic climates and becomes more frequent in more continental areas.

Melanohalea halei can also resemble M. olivacea in general appearance. Several characters distinguish them: M. olivacea has pseudocyphellae, broader lobes, and larger ascospores than M. halei, whereas M. halei is typically darker, has narrower, more rounded lobes, and contains atranorin, resulting in a K+ (yellowish to reddish brown) reaction.

== Habitat and distribution ==
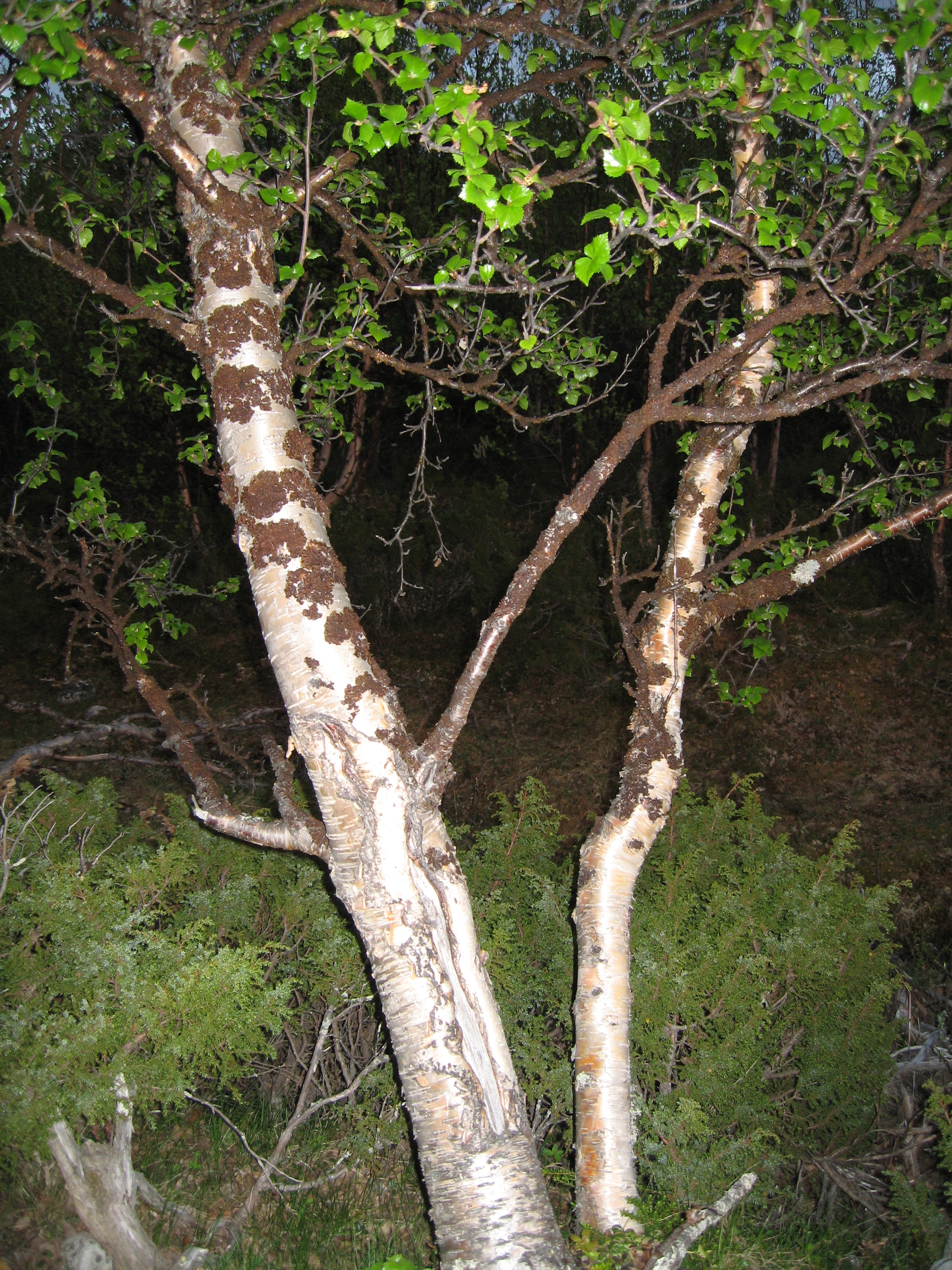
Mountain birch trunks showing the distinct upper boundary of Melanohalea olivacea growth ("olivacea line"), which corresponds to the typical maximum winter snow depth.

Melanohalea olivacea is an epiphytic lichen (growing on plants, especially tree bark) that grows mainly on bark in cool, open, moderately humid habitats, particularly in boreal forests and montane birch woodlands. It is most often recorded from birch bark (Betula spp.), but also from other broadleaved trees and shrubs such as alder (Alnus) and rowan (Sorbus), and only occasionally on dead wood or rock. In Fennoscandia it is strongly associated with well-lit situations and can be especially abundant in mountain birch forests, where it tends to avoid the lower parts of trunks that remain under snow for long periods. In northern Norway, the species preferentially occupies the upper, snow-free parts of birch trunks, unlike some other epiphytic lichens that remain buried under snow for much of the winter. In subarctic birch forests, M. olivacea often forms a conspicuous lower limit on tree trunks, commonly known as the "olivacea line", which corresponds closely to the maximum depth of the winter snowpack. Below this level, prolonged snow cover and ice encapsulation reduce thallus vitality, whereas above it the species can dominate the bark surface and overgrow slower-growing epiphytes. The height of this boundary varies with habitat type and winter conditions and has long been used as a natural indicator of late-winter snow depth in Scandinavian mountain birch woodlands. Recent field studies in subarctic mountain birch forests of northern Finland have quantitatively confirmed that Melanohalea olivacea is concentrated on trunk sections above the average annual snow cover, with a statistically strong relationship between its vertical occurrence and snow depth. In these forests, the species was recorded on all sampled trees and showed a strong association with snow-related variables, with abundance highest above the winter snowline and declining sharply below it. Because snow depth and winter temperature were among the strongest predictors of its occurrence, projected changes in snow cover and winter climate are expected to alter its local abundance and vertical distribution in subarctic birch forests. Studies of boreal forests have shown that epiphytic lichen communities are structured primarily by broad climate variables and which tree species are present, rather than by the same environmental drivers that shape ground-layer lichens.

At the south-western edge of its range in Switzerland, M. olivacea has been found on Betula in the birch belt around raised bogs in cold Jura valleys, typically growing alongside Melanohalea septentrionalis. In north-western China, regional treatments of Melanohalea in Xinjiang include M. olivacea among the species reported from the region.

The species is essentially boreal, with an almost circumpolar distribution and a tendency to become less frequent southwards into the temperate zone. Biogeographically, Melanohalea olivacea is a boreal species with a circumpolar Holarctic distribution, extending farther south mainly in mountains. In a global sampling study, specimens identified as M. olivacea included material from both North America and Eurasia, consistent with a broad Holarctic distribution. Identical ITS haplotypes (matching DNA variants in the ITS barcode region) have been reported from western North America and eastern Asia, consistent with long-distance dispersal in this sexually reproducing, apotheciate species. The species has also been reported from Greenland in modern checklists and included in DNA-barcode work on the region's brown Parmeliaceae aimed at improving identification for long-term monitoring.

Although Melanohalea olivacea has been reported from the Caucasus region in regional catalogues, Sohrabi and colleagues suggested that most such records are probably misidentifications, chiefly confusion with Melanelixia glabra. They considered that recent collections from near the timberline (upper forest limit) in the Russian Caucasus are more likely to represent genuine occurrences of M. olivacea. Consistent with this uncertainty, the distribution maps in Ahti (1966) and Otte et al. (2005) did not show M. olivacea from the Caucasus region.

Within Europe, the species is common in Scandinavia but becomes scarce farther south, and it is very rare in Switzerland, where confirmed records are limited to a few localities in the Jura chain. The first comprehensive European checklist using revised genus concepts for parmelioid lichens placed the species under Melanohalea and provided a country-by-country account of its distribution based on reinterpreted records under the modern taxonomy. That checklist documented Melanohalea olivacea as occurring in several parts of northern and central Europe, while also noting that many earlier reports from other regions referred to different taxa under a broader historical concept of olivacea. Subsequent updates to the checklist confirmed additional national records, including Norway and Switzerland, following further reassessment of material using the revised generic framework.

== Ecology ==
The species is sensitive to prolonged ice encapsulation at mild subfreezing temperatures; increased winter icing events have been discussed as a potential risk to its vitality in boreal and subarctic regions. Across boreal birch forests, variation in epiphytic lichen composition has been shown to be influenced more strongly by factors on individual trees, especially height on the trunk, than by broader ecosystem-scale variables, a pattern that applies to M. olivacea and related species. Because epiphytic lichens respond to climatic gradients independently of ground-layer lichens, M. olivacea and similar canopy species are considered useful indicators of atmospheric and macroclimatic change in boreal forests.

== Conservation ==
NatureServe Explorer assigns Melanohalea olivacea a NatureServe global conservation status rank of G5 (Secure) and lists the global status review date as 9 February 2017.

In Germany, the Red List Centre species profile places Melanohalea olivacea in category 1 (Vom Aussterben bedroht). The profile gives both the initial assessment year and the most recent assessment year as 2011 and reports the species as extrem selten ("extremely rare"). It reports both short-term and long-term trends as stark abnehmend ("strongly decreasing") and lists nutrient enrichment of habitats (eutrophication), forestry activities, and agricultural land use as risk factors. The profile notes that the previous Red List used the name Parmelia olivacea.

In the 2008 Checklist and Red List of lichens of the Czech Republic, the taxon is listed as Melanelia olivacea in category RE (regionally extinct). In that checklist, RE is applied to species that have not been reported for more than 50 years.

== See also ==
- List of lichens named by Carl Linnaeus
