= Emodomelanelia =

Scientific classification
- Kingdom: Fungi
- Division: Ascomycota
- Class: Lecanoromycetes
- Order: Lecanorales
- Family: Parmeliaceae
- Genus: Emodomelanelia (Essl. & Poelt) Divakar & A.Crespo (2010)
- Species: E. masonii

Binomial name
- Emodomelanelia masonii (Essl. & Poelt) Divakar & A.Crespo (2010)

Synonyms
- Parmelia masonii Essl. & Poelt (1991)

Single-species fungal genus

Emodomelanelia is a lichen genus in the family Parmeliaceae. It is monospecific, containing the single foliose Himalayan species Emodomelanelia masonii.

== Taxonomy ==
Emodomelanelia masonii was first described in 1991 as Parmelia masonii by the lichenologists Theodore Esslinger and Josef Poelt. It was named in honour of Mason Hale, the "preeminent student of the Parmeliaceae". The genus was circumscribed in 2010 by Pradeep Kumar Divakar and Ana Crespo. Emodomelanelia is in the "Melanohalea" clade (one of nine major groups in the Parmelioid clade of the Parmeliaceae) along with the genera Melanelixia and Melanohalea. The genus name combines emodo (referring to the Himalayas) and melanelia (referring to the brown colour of the upper thallus surface).

== Description ==
Characteristics of the genus Emodomelanelia include an olive brown to brown thallus, narrow to moderately broad lobes, a non-pored epicortex, the presence of effigurate pseudocyphellae (i.e. with a lobed shape), and bifusiform conidia. The cortex stains green with nitric acid (HNO_{3}^{+}).

== Habitat and distribution ==
Emodomelanelia masonii is endemic to the Himalayas, where it grows on rocks in alpine and subalpine habitats. It has been recorded from mainland China, India, Nepal and Taiwan. In Nepal, Parmelia masonii has been reported from 3,000 to 6,100 m elevation in a compilation of published records, and it was treated as endemic to Nepal in the source; this reported range extends above the tree line used in the study.
