= Melanohalea mexicana =

Scientific classification
- Kingdom: Fungi
- Division: Ascomycota
- Class: Lecanoromycetes
- Order: Lecanorales
- Family: Parmeliaceae
- Genus: Melanohalea
- Species: M. mexicana

Binomial name
- Melanohalea mexicana Essl. & R.-E.Pérez (2010)

Species of lichen-forming fungus

Melanohalea mexicana is a species of foliose lichen in the family Parmeliaceae. Found in Mexico, it was described as a new species in 2010 by Ted Esslinger and Rosa Emilia Pérez-Pérez. Within the genus Melanohalea, molecular phylogenetic analysis places it in the "subolivacea" group, which includes the species M. subolivacea and M. clairi.
