= Melanohalea peruviana =

Scientific classification
- Kingdom: Fungi
- Division: Ascomycota
- Class: Lecanoromycetes
- Order: Lecanorales
- Family: Parmeliaceae
- Genus: Melanohalea
- Species: M. peruviana

Binomial name
- Melanohalea peruviana Essl. (2012)

Species of lichen

Melanohalea peruviana is a little-known species of foliose lichen in the family Parmeliaceae. Described in 2012 from a single specimen collected at 4,400 meters elevation in Peru's Cordillera Blanca mountain range, this lichen forms small, tightly attached rosettes on angiosperm twigs in high-Andean scrubland. It represents the first member of its mainly north-temperate genus reported from tropical South America and is distinguished from similar species by having eight ascospores per reproductive cell rather than the typical 16–32.

== Taxonomy ==
Melanohalea peruviana is a small, fertile brown parmelioid lichen in the family Parmeliaceae. It was described from a single collection taken on 28 February 1981 at Laguna Llaca, about 4,400 m (14,400 ft) elevation, in the Ancash Region of central Peru. The holotype is housed in the Uppsala herbarium (UPS). The species is readily told from its look-alike, the North American M. trabeculata, by having eight (rather than 16–32) spores per ascus and by the complete absence of secondary metabolites in the medulla. It represents the first member of the mainly north-temperate genus Melanohalea reported from tropical South America.

== Description ==
The thallus of M. peruviana is foliose (leaf-like) but tightly appressed to the twig, forming rosettes up to about 1.5 cm across. Lobes are narrow (0.4–1.0 mm), mostly flat, and become weakly convex toward the center. Their upper surface is brown to olive-brown, shiny—especially at the lobe tips—and develops low wrinkles (a rugose texture) with age; conspicuous vegetative outgrowths such as soredia or isidia are absent. Tiny, same-colored pseudocyphellae (pin-prick pores that aid gas exchange) are sparse and hard to see. The lower surface is dark brown and distinctly trabeculate (marked by raised ridges) and carries matching brown rhizines that anchor the thallus.

Rounded to slightly convex apothecia are common; they are sessile, up to 2 mm wide, and bordered by an entire or weakly scalloped margin. The spore-bearing layer (hymenium) is 55–60 μm tall; asci hold eight colorless, broadly ellipsoid ascospores witgh dimensions of 6–8 × 5–7 μm. Immersed black pycnidia produce slender conidia 6–7 × about 1 μm. Standard spot tests are negative and thin-layer chromatography fails to detect any lichen substances.

== Habitat and distribution ==
The only known specimen grew on angiosperm twigs in open, high-Andean scrub at 4400 m in the Cordillera Blanca of Peru. No additional populations have been recorded, making the species apparently endemic to its type locality.
