= Melanohalea clairi =

Scientific classification
- Kingdom: Fungi
- Division: Ascomycota
- Class: Lecanoromycetes
- Order: Lecanorales
- Family: Parmeliaceae
- Genus: Melanohalea
- Species: M. clairi

Binomial name
- Melanohalea clairi S.D.Leav., Essl., Divakar, A.Crespo & Lumbsch (2016)

Species of lichen

Melanohalea clairi is a species of lichen in the family Parmeliaceae. It was described as a new species in 2016. It is known from only two locations in the United States. The type specimen was collected from the White River National Forest in Colorado, in juniper-oak mountainous shrubland. Here it was found growing on Gambel oak. It has also been collected from the Wasatch Front in central Utah, where it was recorded on bigtooth maple. The lichen is morphologically similar to Melanohalea subolivacea, but is genetically distinct from that species.
