= Myconet =

- Discipline: Mycology
- Language: English
- Edited by: H. Thorsten Lumbsch, Sabine Huhndorf

Publication details
- History: 1997–2007
- Publisher: Umeå University, later The Field Museum

Standard abbreviations
- ISO 4: Myconet

Indexing
- ISSN: 1403-1418
- OCLC no.: 185380272

Links
- Journal homepage

Myconet was a peer-reviewed mycological journal intended for the documentation of selected mycosystematic files published on the Internet. The journal was published from 1997 to 2007.
