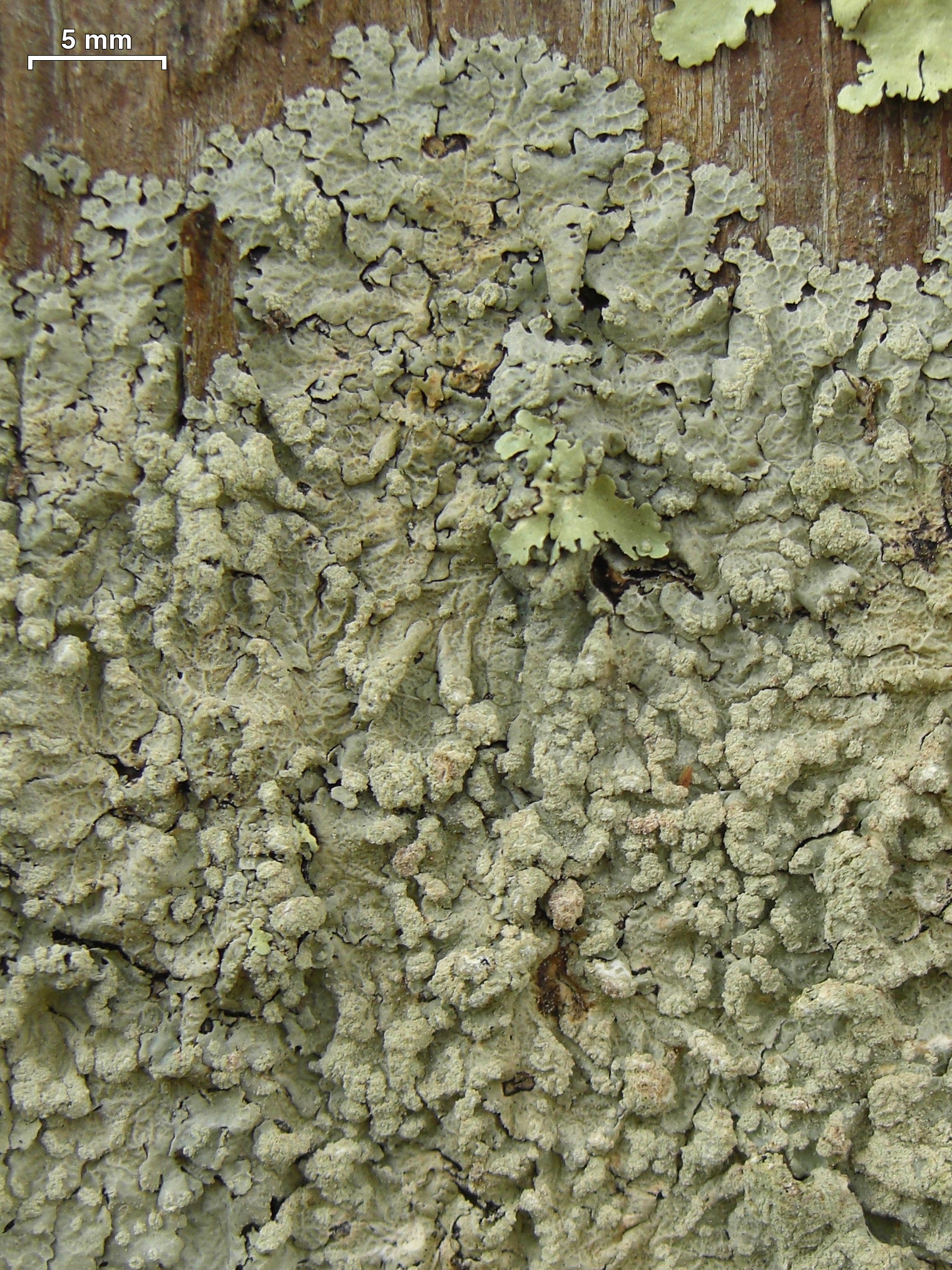
- Crespoa crozalsiana

Scientific classification
- Domain: Eukaryota
- Kingdom: Fungi
- Division: Ascomycota
- Class: Lecanoromycetes
- Order: Lecanorales
- Family: Parmeliaceae
- Genus: Crespoa (D.Hawksw.) Lendemer & B.P.Hodk. (2013)

Type species
- Crespoa crozalsiana (B.de Lesd. ex Harm.) Lendemer & B.P.Hodk. (2013)

Species
- C. carneopruinata C. crozalsiana C. inhaminensis C. schelpei C. scrobicularis

Synonyms
- Parmotrema subgen. Crespoa D.Hawksw. (2011)

= Crespoa =

Genus of fungi

Crespoa is a genus of five species of lichen in the family Parmeliaceae. Species in this genus are characterized by having an upper thallus surface that is wrinkled and reticulately ridged to coarsely foveolate (having small pits or depressions).

== Description ==
Crespoa species have a distinctive thallus structure, with a strongly reticulately ridged and wrinkled upper surface, and medullary stictic and constictic acids, with the exception of C. schelpei, which has medullary protocetraric acid.

== Distribution ==
All of the species in Crespoa have a more or less tropical distribution, although the range of C. carneopruinata also extends into southern France and Italy, while the distribution of the type species C. crozalsiana includes the US and southern Europe. C. scrobicularis has been reported from Oceania and South America, including Argentina, Brazil, Paraguay, and Venezuela.

== Taxonomy ==
Species in Crespoa were originally considered part of the Parmelia crozalsiana group, united by similarities in the morphology of their vegetative thallus. This group was placed in Pseudoparmelia by Mason Hale in 1976, and then later in Canoparmelia. More recently, molecular analysis demonstrated that this group of four species forms a well-supported monophyletic clade that is sister to a clade containing members of the genus Parmotrema, and were therefore unsuitably classified as members of Canoparmelia. For this reason, David Leslie Hawksworth formally defined Parmotrema subgenus Crespoa to contain this group, suggesting "generic rank is not appropriate ... as there are no features from the ascomata or conidiomata that distinguish it ... from Parmotrema." In a later analysis, this subgenus was promoted to status as a distinct genus, due to both differences in thallus morphology, and its significant genetic distance from Parmotrema.

In 2014, Michel Benatti and James Lendemer proposed transferring Parmelia scrobicularis (also known as Pseudoparmelia scrobicularis and Canoparmelia scrobicularis) to Crespoa based on its shared morphological and chemical characteristics, albeit without providing phylogenetic support. In 2016, Kirika and colleagues suggested that Crespoa should be subsumed within Parmotrema, and treated as a subgenus, as per Hawksworth's proposal. In 2017, Michelin and colleagues confirmed the correct generic placement of Crespoa scrobicularis using molecular analysis, and also confirmed the monophyly of Crespoa. An analysis of the phylogeny of the Parmeliaceae using a next-generation DNA sequencing technique (target enrichment sequencing) also supports accepting Crespoa at the genus level.

The genus name Crespoa honours Spanish lichenologist Ana Crespo, "in recognition of the lead she has taken in rationalizing generic and specific concepts in the parmelioid lichens using molecular phylogenetic approaches."

== Species ==
- Crespoa carneopruinata (Zahlbr.) Lendemer & B.P.Hodk. (2013)
- Crespoa crozalsiana (B.de Lesd. ex Harm.) Lendemer & B.P.Hodk. (2013)
- Crespoa inhaminensis (C.W.Dodge) Lendemer & B.P.Hodk. (2013)
- Crespoa schelpei (Hale) Lendemer & B.P.Hodk. (2013)
- Crespoa scrobicularis (Kremp.) Benatti & Lendemer (2014)
