= Melanohalea nilgirica =

Scientific classification
- Domain: Eukaryota
- Kingdom: Fungi
- Division: Ascomycota
- Class: Lecanoromycetes
- Order: Lecanorales
- Family: Parmeliaceae
- Genus: Melanohalea
- Species: M. nilgirica

Binomial name
- Melanohalea nilgirica Divakar & Upreti (2005)

Species of lichen

Melanohalea nilgirica is a species of foliose lichen in the family Parmeliaceae. Found in India, it was described as a new species in 2005 by lichenologists Pradeep Divakar and Dalip Kumar Upreti. The type was collected from the Nilgiri Hills in Tamil Nadu, at an elevation of 2,000 m (6,600 ft). Its thallus is about 6 cm (2.4 in) in diameter, with a reddish-brown to dark brown upper surface. It is characterized by flat, dot-like pseudocyphellae that are flush with the lobe surface, white capitate soralia, and presence of caperatic acid. This is the only known occurrence of this compound in the genus Melanohalea.
