= Melanohalea lobulata =

Scientific classification
- Domain: Eukaryota
- Kingdom: Fungi
- Division: Ascomycota
- Class: Lecanoromycetes
- Order: Lecanorales
- Family: Parmeliaceae
- Genus: Melanohalea
- Species: M. lobulata

Binomial name
- Melanohalea lobulata F.G.Meng & H.Y.Wang (2009)

Species of lichen in the family Parmeliaceae

Melanohalea lobulata is a species of foliose lichen in the family Parmeliaceae. Found in the Tibetan Plateau, it was formally described as a new species in 2009 by Fan-Ge Meng and Hai-Ying Wang. The type was collected in Kazilashan, Litang County (Sichuan), at an elevation of 4,710 m (15,450 ft). Here it was found growing on twigs. Its thallus measures 2–13 cm (0.8–5.1 in) in diameter, and has a dark brown upper surface. The elongated-ellipsoid lobules that are developed from papillae (little bumps) distinguish M. lobulata from all the other Melanohalea species.
