= Melanohalea subexasperata =

Scientific classification
- Domain: Eukaryota
- Kingdom: Fungi
- Division: Ascomycota
- Class: Lecanoromycetes
- Order: Lecanorales
- Family: Parmeliaceae
- Genus: Melanohalea
- Species: M. subexasperata

Binomial name
- Melanohalea subexasperata F.G.Meng & H.Y.Wang (2010)

Species of lichen

Melanohalea subexasperata is a species of foliose lichen in the family Parmeliaceae. Found in China, it was formally described as a new species in 2010 by Fan-Ge Meng and Hai-Ying Wang. The type was collected from Tianshenqiao, Shangri-La City (Yunnan Province), at an altitude of 3,500 m (11,500 ft). The lichen is distributed in the southeast of the Tibetan Plateau at elevations of 2,700–3,500 m (8,900–11,500 ft). It is the only species of Melanohalea with cortical hairs. The lichen is named for its resemblance to Melanohalea exasperata.
