= Amy Y. Rossman =

American mycologist (1946- )

Amy Yarnell Rossman (born September 20, 1946, in Spokane, Washington) is an American mycologist and a leading expert in identifying fungi.

== Biography ==
Born in Spokane, Amy Rossman moved with her family, when she was six months old, to Portland, Oregon, and considers herself to be a native Oregonian. Rossman graduated with a B.A. in biology from Grinnell College in 1968. She received her Ph.D. in mycology in 1975 from Oregon State University (OSU). Her Ph.D. thesis The genus Ophionectria (Ascomycetes, Hypocreales) was supervised by William C. Denison (1929–2005). As a graduate student she collected fungi in June 1970 in Puerto Rico's El Yunque National Forest and in Dominica and then in January 1971 in Jamaica. She held a teaching fellowship in mycology from 1978 to 1978 at Cornell University. From 1979 to 1980 she was a research associate in botany at New York Botanical Garden (NYBG). During the years from 1978 to 1980 she collected fungi in the neotropics. From 1980 to 1983 she worked as a mycologist for the USDA's Animal and Plant Health Inspection Service. In 1983 she became a mycologist for the USDA's Agricultural Research Service and was appointed director of the U.S. National Fungus Collections. In the late 1980s the Systematic Botany and Mycology Laboratory (SBML) was formed and she was appointed the SBML's research leader.

In French Guiana on a 1986 expedition sponsored by the Biological Diversity of the Guiana Shield Program, Rossman met the French botanist Christian P. Feuillet. They married in King County, Washington, on 4 September 1988. They have a daughter.

In 1996 Rossman told the science journalist Carol Kaesuk Yoon that for some types of organisms, such as microfungi, New York state's forests are almost as unexplored as the tropical forests. Rossman, with coauthor David L. Hawksworth, suggested that about 1.4 million fungal species were undescribed as of 1997.

In 2009 Rossman became the research leader of the Systematic Mycology and Microbiology Laboratory (SMML) in Beltsville, Maryland. She has also been director and curator of the U.S. National Fungus Collections (BPI — USDA Bureau of Plant Industry), which are located at the SMML. The SMML and the U.S. National Fungus Collections are part of the USDA's Agricultural Research Service. She led research on Hypocreales (particularly Calonectria, Nectria and Ophionectria), Diaporthales and other microfungi that cause plant diseases. She made important collections, not only with her husband, but also with Laurence Skog and Gary Joseph Samuels. Together with David F. Farr, she manages a database containing information about the fungal specimens in the U.S. National Fungus Collections. They also maintain a database with data on fungi that have plants as hosts. She has contributed extensively to the Index Fungorum.

Rossman retired in 2014 from her USDA position. In retirement she has lived in Corvallis, Oregon, where she has an office at Oregon State University. She is on the editorial board of the mycological journal Studies in Mycology.

She was elected in 2004 a Fellow of the American Association for the Advancement of Science (AAAS).

== Books ==
- Rossman, Amy Y. (1983). The phragmosporous species of Nectria and related genera: (Calonectria, Ophionectria, Paranectria, Scoleconectria, and Trichonectria). Mycological papers, no. 150. Kew, Surrey, England: Commonwealth Mycological Institute. LCCN 83170359; 164 pages, illustrated
- Rossman, Amy Y.; Palm, Mary E.; Spielman, Linda J. (1987). A literature guide for the identification of plant pathogenic fungi. Contributions from the U.S. National Fungus Collections, no. 1. St. Paul, Minnesota: American Phytopathological Society. ISBN 0890540802. LCCN 87070764; written in cooperation with David F. Farr; pbk, 252 pages
- Brako, Lois; Rossman, Amy Y.; Farr, David F. (1995). Scientific and common names of 7,000 vascular plants in the United States. St. Paul, Minnesota: APS Press. ISBN 089054171X. LCCN 94079381; iii+295 pages
- Hoagland, K. Elaine; Rossman, Amy Y., eds. (1997). Global genetic resources: access, ownership, and intellectual property rights (Invited papers presented at a symposium held May 19-22, 1996 at the Beltsville Agricultural Research Center, Beltsville, Maryland, sponsored by U.S. Department of Agriculture, Agricultural Research Service, and the Association of Systematics Collections). Beltsville symposia in agricultural research, no. 21. LCCN 97018495; xi+347 pages, illustrated
- Rossman, Amy Y.; Tulloss, Rodham E.; O'Dell, Thomas E.; Thorn, R. Greg, eds. (1998). Protocols for an all taxa biodiversity inventory of fungi in a Costa Rican conservation area. Boone, N.C.: Parkway Publishers. ISBN 1887905057. LCCN 97044635; with a foreword by Daniel H. Janzen & Winnie Hallwachs; xvii+195 pages, illustrated
