= Cora davidia =

Scientific classification
- Kingdom: Fungi
- Division: Basidiomycota
- Class: Agaricomycetes
- Order: Agaricales
- Family: Hygrophoraceae
- Genus: Cora
- Species: C. davidia

Binomial name
- Cora davidia B.Moncada, L.Y.Vargas & Lücking (2016)

Species of lichen

Cora davidia is a species of basidiolichen in the family Hygrophoraceae. It was formally described as a new species in 2016 by Bibiana Moncada, Leidy Vargas-Mendoza, and Robert Lücking. The specific epithet davidia honours mycologist David Leslie Hawksworth, "in recognition of his nomenclatural work on Dictyonema." The lichen occurs above elevations of 3,000 m (9,800 ft) in the northern Andes of Colombia and Ecuador, where it grows as an epiphyte on the twigs of small trees and shrubs in somewhat shaded locales.
