= David Leslie Hawksworth =

British biologist, mycologist and lichenologist (born 1946)

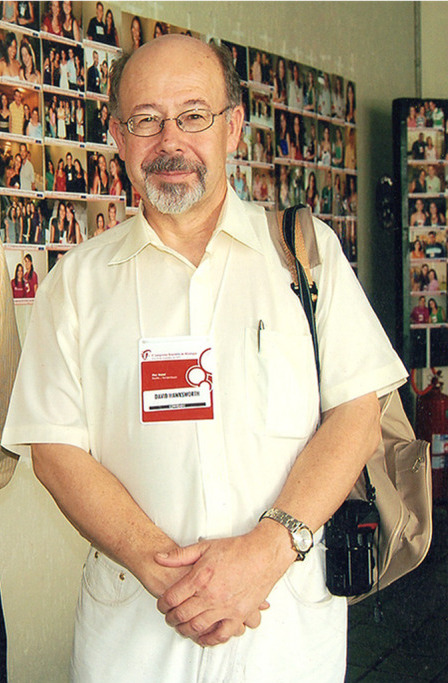
- Hawksworth at the 5th Congresso Brasiliero de Micologia, Recife, 2007
- Born: 1946 (age 79–80); Sheffield, UK
- Education: University of Leicester
- Scientific career
- Fields: Mycology; lichenology
- Author abbrev. (botany): D.Hawksw.

David Leslie Hawksworth CBE (born 1946 in Sheffield, UK) is a British mycologist and lichenologist currently with a professorship in the Universidad Complutense de Madrid in Madrid, Spain and also a Scientific Associate of The Natural History Museum in London. Hawksworth has had a prolific career, authoring nearly 600 scientific works (including almost 60 books), describing approximately 250 new taxa, and proposing around 500 new combinations or new names in fungal nomenclature. In 1996, he was honoured as Commander of the British Empire (CBE). In 2002, he received the Acharius Medal from the International Association for Lichenology. Five genera and many species have been named in his honour.

Hawksworth's research has focused on broad nomenclatural issues, fostering the integration of fungal nomenclature, and global assessment of fungal diversity. He has conducted systematic revisions of neglected groups, including lichenicolous taxa and fungi at the borderline of lichenisation, with a particular interest in the family Parmeliaceae. From 1983 to 1997, Hawksworth served as director of the International Mycological Institute (IMI), overseeing its name change to Commonwealth Mycological Institute in 1986 and its move from Kew to Egham in 1993.

He married Patricia Wiltshire, a leading forensic ecologist and palynologist in 2009. As of 2022, he is the Editor-in-Chief of the journals IMA Fungus and Biodiversity and Conservation.

== Education ==
Born in Sheffield in 1946, David Hawksworth studied at the University of Leicester. From this institution, he earned a BSc in 1967, a PhD in 1970, and a DSc in 1980.

== Career reflections ==
In a 2020 article reflecting on his 50-year career in mycology, Hawksworth shared ten key lessons he had learnt as a fungal systematist. Among these, he emphasised the importance of thorough research before describing new taxa, stressing that it is far easier to introduce a new name than to determine if a fungus has already been described. Hawksworth advocated for examining as many specimens as possible to understand species variation and utilising a wide range of techniques to study fungal characteristics.

Hawksworth highlighted the significance of careful microscopic examination and measurement of fungal structures, noting the potential impact of different mounting media on spore sizes. He encouraged mycologists to challenge existing ideas and present new hypotheses, citing his own work in integrating lichen-forming fungi into a single classification system with other fungi. Another key lesson stressed the importance of preserving type specimens and vouchers for unusual records to ensure the validity of taxonomic work.

Throughout his career, Hawksworth has been at the forefront of adopting new technologies in mycological research. He was among the first in the UK to use chromatography, scanning electron microscopy, and numerical taxonomy in the systematics of lichen-forming fungi. Hawksworth has also been a proponent of molecular methods in fungal taxonomy, collaborating with other researchers to address key questions in the field. He emphasised the value of teamwork in modern mycology, noting that multi-authored papers have become the norm in addressing complex research questions.

== Recognition ==
In 1978, Hawksworth received the Bicentenary Medal of the Linnean Society. He was awarded an honorary doctorate from the Umeå University in 1996. In 2014, Hawksworth was awarded the Ainsworth Medal from the International Mycological Association, given to "an individual for recognition of extraordinary service to world mycology".

=== Eponymy ===
Five genera and many species have been named to honour Hawksworth. These include: Davidhawksworthia Crous (2016); Dlhawksworthia Wanas., Camporesi & K.D.Hyde (2018); Hawksworthia Manohar., N.K.Rao, D.K.Agarwal & Kunwar (2004); Hawksworthiana U.Braun (1988); Hawksworthiomyces Z.W.de Beer, Marinc. & M.J.Wingf. (2016); Arthonia hawksworthii Halıcı (2008); Ascotrichella hawksworthii Valldos. & Guarro (1988); Cylindrocladium hawksworthii Peerally (1991); Daldinia hawksworthii Pažoutová, Šrůtka & M.Stadler (2013); Epaphroconidia hawksworthii Calat. & V.Atienza (1995); Laburnicola hawksworthii Wanas., Camporesi, E.B.G.Jones & K.D.Hyde (2016); Lichenoconium hawksworthii Flakus, Etayo, Kukwa & Rodr.Flakus (2021); Lichenodiplis hawksworthii F.Berger & Diederich (1996); Melanelixia hawksworthii S.D.Leav., Essl., Divakar, A.Crespo & Lumbsch (2016); Murispora hawksworthii Wanas., E.B.G.Jones & K.D.Hyde (2015); Polycoccum hawksworthianum Y.Joshi (2020); Rhopalostroma hawksworthii Vaidya, A.D.M.Rayner & Whalley (1991); Sclerococcum hawksworthii Etayo & Diederich (1995); Skyttea hawksworthii Diederich (1986); Taeniolella hawksworthiana Heuchert, Ertz & Common (2016); and Uromyces hawksworthii É.S.C.Souza, Z.M.Chaves, W.R.O.Soares, Pinho & Dianese (2015).

In 2020, on the occasion of David Hawksworth's 70th birthday, Robert Lücking and colleagues described 70 new species of lichenised basidiomycete fungi in the genus Cora, many of which were named in his honour. This represented the largest number of new species ever described in a single publication for lichens. The authors devised creative variations on Hawksworth's name for the species epithets, including:

- Direct references like C. hawksworthiana and C. davidia
- Anagrams such as C. dalehana and C. viliewoa
- References to the meaning or origin of his name, like C. accipiter ("hawk")
- Plays on his initials DLH, as in C. hochesuordensis
- Allusions to places associated with the Hawksworth name, e.g. C. hafecesweorthensis

The paper and mass-naming event highlighted Hawksworth's significant contributions to mycology and lichenology over his career. It also demonstrated the previously unrecognised biodiversity in the genus Cora, which Hawksworth had earlier worked on nomenclaturally.

== Selected publications ==
=== Articles ===
- Hawksworth, D. L.; Rose, F. (1970). "Qualitative Scale for estimating Sulphur Dioxide Air Pollution in England and Wales using Epiphytic Lichens". Nature. 227 (5254): 145–148. Bibcode:1970Natur.227..145H. doi:10.1038/227145a0. PMID 5428399. S2CID 4219503.
- Hawksworth, D. L. (1988). "The variety of fungal-algal symbioses, their evolutionary significance, and the nature of lichens". Botanical Journal of the Linnean Society. 96: 3–20. doi:10.1111/j.1095-8339.1988.tb00623.x.
- Hawksworth, D.L. (1991). "The fungal dimension of biodiversity: Magnitude, significance, and conservation". Mycological Research. 95 (6): 641–655. doi:10.1016/S0953-7562(09)80810-1.
- Harper, J. L.; Hawksworth, D. L. (1994). "Biodiversity: Measurement and estimation. Preface". Philosophical Transactions of the Royal Society of London. Series B: Biological Sciences. 345 (1311): 5–12. doi:10.1098/rstb.1994.0081. PMID 7972355.
- Hawksworth, David L.; Rossman, Amy Y. (1997). "Where Are All the Undescribed Fungi?". Phytopathology. 87 (9): 888–891. Bibcode:1997PhPat..87..888H. doi:10.1094/PHYTO.1997.87.9.888. PMID 18945058.
- Hawksworth, David L. (2001). "The magnitude of fungal diversity: The 1.5 million species estimate revisited". Mycological Research. 105 (12): 1422–1432. doi:10.1017/S0953756201004725.
- Hawksworth, David L. (2011). "A new dawn for the naming of fungi: Impacts of decisions made in Melbourne in July 2011 on the future publication and regulation of fungal names". IMA Fungus. 2 (2): 155–162. doi:10.5598/imafungus.2011.02.02.06. PMC 3359813. PMID 22679600.
- Hawksworth, David L.; Lücking, Robert (2017). "Fungal Diversity Revisited: 2.2 to 3.8 Million Species". The Fungal Kingdom. pp. 79–95. doi:10.1128/9781555819583.ch4. ISBN 9781683670827.

=== Books and monographs ===
- with Francis Rose: Air pollution and lichens. 1976.
- with David J. Hill: The lichen-forming fungi. 1984.

=== as editor ===
- with B. W. Ferry and M. S. Baddeley: Air pollution and lichens. 1973.
- Ascomycete Systematics. Problems and Perspectives in the Nineties. 1994.
- with Alan T. Bull: Arthropod diversity and conservation. Springer. 2006. ISBN 9781402052040.
- with Alan T. Bull: Hawksworth, David L.; Bull, Alan T. (2006). Forest diversity and management. Springer. ISBN 1402052073.
- with Alan T. Bull: Hawksworth, David L.; Bull, Alan T. (2006). Marine, freshwater, and wetlands biodiversity conservation. Springer. ISBN 9781402057342.
- with Alan T. Bull: Hawksworth, David L.; Bull, Alan T. (2007). Vertebrate conservation and biodiversity. Springer. ISBN 978-1402063190.
- with Alan T. Bull: Hawksworth, David L.; Bull, Alan T. (2007). Plant conservation and biodiversity. Springer. ISBN 9781402064449.

== See also ==
- Category:Taxa named by David Leslie Hawksworth
