= Theodore Lee Esslinger =

American lichenologist

Theodore Lee ("Ted") Esslinger (born 1944) is an American lichenologist and former professor of botany. He is best known for his systematic work on the brown parmelioid lichens and for developing online resources for lichen taxonomy.

== Career ==
Esslinger studied at Eastern Washington University, the University of Idaho, and Duke University, where he completed his PhD in 1975 under William and Chicita Culberson. His dissertation, titled A Chemosystematic Revision of the Brown Parmeliae, focused on the chemical and morphological variation within the group. After a postdoctoral year at the Smithsonian Institution with Mason Hale, he joined the faculty at North Dakota State University (NDSU) in Fargo, where he has taught botany since 1975. As of 2025, he is listed as an emeritus professor at NDSU.

He has published extensively on the taxonomy of parmelioid lichens, the family Physciaceae, and the genus Oropogon. From 1991 to 2006, he maintained the influential online bibliography Recent literature on lichens, which compiled and indexed lichenological publications worldwide. He served as president of the American Bryological and Lichenological Society from 2007 to 2009.

== Recognition ==
The fungal genus Esslingeriana was named in his honour, as were the species Ocellularia esslingeri Hale (1978); Xanthoparmelia esslingeri O.Blanco, A.Crespo, Elix, D.Hawksw. & Lumbsch (2004); Phaeophyscia esslingeri S.Y.Kondr., Lőkös, J.J.Woo & Hur (2016); and Peltigera esslingeri Magain, Miądl. & Sérus. (2023).

== Selected publications ==
- Esslinger, T.L. (1977). "A chemosystematic revision of the brown Parmeliae". Journal of the Hattori Botanical Laboratory. 42: 1–211. doi:10.18968/jhbl.42.0_1.
- Esslinger, Theodore L. (1980). "Typification of Oropogon loxensis and description of two related species". The Bryologist. 83 (4): 529–532. doi:10.2307/3242309. JSTOR 3242309.
- Esslinger, Theodore L. (1989). "Systematics of Oropogon (Alectoriaceae) in the New World". Systematic Botany Monographs. 28: 1. doi:10.2307/25027728. JSTOR 25027728.
- Esslinger, Theodore L. (2021). "A cumulative checklist for the lichen-forming, lichenicolous and allied fungi of the Continental United States and Canada, version 24". Opuscula Philolichenum. 20: 100–394. doi:10.5962/p.388279.

== See also ==
- Category:Taxa named by Theodore Lee Esslinger
