= Helge Thorsten Lumbsch =

German lichenologist

- Born: 1964 (age 61–62)
- Education: University of Marburg; University of Duisburg-Essen
- Scientific career
- Fields: Lichenology
- Workplaces: Field Museum of Natural History
- Author abbrev. (botany): Lumbsch

Helge Thorsten Lumbsch (born 1964) is a German-born lichenologist living in the United States. His research interests include the phylogeny, taxonomy, and phylogeography of lichen-forming fungi; lichen diversity; lichen chemistry and chemotaxonomy. He is the Associate Curator and Head of Cryptogams and Chair of the Department of Botany at the Field Museum of Natural History.

== Biography ==
Lumbsch was born in Frankfurt in 1964. Interested in lichens already as a schoolboy, he studied natural sciences at the University of Marburg, under the tutelage of Aino Henssen. He received his diploma in 1989, with a dissertation titled Ontogenetisch-systematische Studien der Trapeliaceae und verwandter Familien (Lichenisierte Ascomyceten) ("Ontogenic-systematic studies of the Trapeliaceae and related families (lichenized ascomycetes)"). After Henssen's retirement in 1990, he transferred to the University in Essen, where he worked on the Lecanora subfusca group in Australasia, a subject that was the topic of his PhD dissertation. In 1993 he completed his doctorate under the supervision of Guido Benno Feige.

Between 1994 and 1997, Lumbsch did postdoctoral research at the Botanical Garden of the University of Duisburg-Essen; in 1998–2003 he was a private lecturer there. Between 2003 and 2006 he was the Assistant curator at the Field Museum of Natural History. Since 2004, Lumbsch has been a member of committee on Evolutionary Biology at the University of Chicago, an interdepartmental and inter-institutional graduate student training program. In the years 2005–2009 he was the head of Cryptogams at the Field Museum, and between 2006 and 2014, the Associate Curator. Lumbsch was the president of the International Association for Lichenology in the years 2012–2016.

Lumbsch has been the author or coauthor of more than 500 publications, many of which deal with molecular phylogenetics of various taxa of lichens. Together with Guido Benno Feige he published two exsiccatae (collections of dried specimens), one on the Umbilicariaceae, and the other on Lecanoroid lichens. In his 2009 survey of influential lichenologists, Ingvar Kärnefelt calls him "a leading scientist on systematics and evolution of lichenized fungi." In September 2025, Lumbsch was elected a foreign member of the Royal Academy of Exact, Physical and Natural Sciences of Spain.

== Eponymy ==
Several lichen species have been named in honour of Lumbsch, including: Paraparmelia lumbschii Elix (1996); Graphina lumbschii A.W.Archer (2001); Sticta lumbschiana Moncada & Lücking (2013); Fissurina lumbschiana Weerakoon, Jayalal & Lücking (2015); Ocellularia lumbschii S.Joshi & Hur (2015); and Pertusaria lumbschii A.W.Archer & Elix (2017).

== Selected publications ==
- Printzen, Christian; Lumbsch, H.Thorsten (2000). "Molecular evidence for the diversification of extant lichens in the late Cretaceous and Tertiary". Molecular Phylogenetics and Evolution. 17 (3): 379–387. doi:10.1006/mpev.2000.0856. PMID 11133192.
- Lumbsch, H. T.; Ahti, T.; Altermann, S.; De Paz, G. A.; Aptroot, A.; Arup, U.; et al. (2011). "One hundred new species of lichenized fungi: a signature of undiscovered global diversity" (PDF). Phytotaxa. 18 (1): 1–127. doi:10.11646/phytotaxa.18.1.1.
- Huang, Jen-Pan; Kraichak, Ekaphan; Leavitt, Steven D.; Nelsen, Matthew P.; Lumbsch, H. Thorsten (2019). "Accelerated diversifications in three diverse families of morphologically complex lichen-forming fungi link to major historical events". Scientific Reports. 9 (1): 8518. doi:10.1038/s41598-019-44881-1. PMC 6599062. PMID 31253825.
- Mercado‐Díaz, Joel A.; Lücking, Robert; Moncada, Bibiana; Widhelm, Todd J.; Lumbsch, H. Thorsten (2020). "Elucidating species richness in lichen fungi: The genus Sticta (Ascomycota: Peltigeraceae) in Puerto Rico". Taxon. 69 (5): 851–891. doi:10.1002/tax.12320.

A partial list of his publications (249) may be found by accessing the Scholia link above.
