= Ana Crespo =

Spanish lichenologist

Ana María Crespo de las Casas (born 30 March 1948, Santa Cruz de Tenerife) is a Spanish lichenologist noted for studying the phytosociology, taxonomy and floristics of Mediterranean lichens. She was awarded the 2012 Acharius Medal from the International Association for Lichenology for lifetime achievements in lichenology. She is known for her pioneering work in molecular techniques and integrative taxonomy of lichen-forming fungi, particularly within the family Parmeliaceae.

== Biography ==
Ana Crespo was born and raised in Tenerife in the Canary Islands, an archipelago that has remained significant in her research throughout her career. She moved to Madrid to study biology at the Universidad Complutense de Madrid, where she completed her doctoral thesis in 1973 with summa cum laude. Her thesis focused on the flora and vegetation of epiphytic lichens of the Sierra de Guadarrama, and was co-supervised by Gerhard Follmann and Salvador Rivas-Martínez.

In the early stages of her career, Crespo was influenced by the phytosociological school of Salvador Rivas-Martínez in Madrid. She developed strong international connections with lichenologists across Europe at a time when Spain had no established lichenological tradition. Her postdoctoral research concentrated on phytosociology, floristics, and taxonomy of Mediterranean lichens while simultaneously teaching at the Universidad Complutense and training graduate students in lichenology.

Crespo was promoted to Full Professor (Catedrática) in 1983 in the Pharmacy Faculty at the Universidad Complutense de Madrid, where she continued her research on the taxonomy and systematics of lichens with particular focus on the western Mediterranean and Macaronesia.

== Political career ==
From 1987 to 1993, Crespo took a hiatus from academic work to serve in the Spanish government under Prime Minister Felipe González. She held positions as Director General for the Secretary of State for Universities and Research (1987–1991) and Director General for Universities (1991–1993). During this period, she implemented initiatives to reform science and universities in Spain and integrate them into the European scientific landscape, helping to establish the foundation for Spain's current scientific excellence.

== Scientific contributions ==
After returning from her political career, Crespo reinvented her scientific focus by spending a year at the International Mycological Institute in Egham, UK, to learn molecular techniques. Upon returning to Madrid, she pioneered the application of molecular analysis to understanding the evolutionary history of the family Parmeliaceae.

Her research has had significant impact on multiple areas in the field of lichenology. Crespo was instrumental in creating a consensus classification for the Parmeliaceae, bringing together lichenologists with competing classification approaches. This culminated in a landmark 2010 paper synthesizing the classification system. She was at the forefront of adopting new technological developments in molecular analysis and genetic databases, leading to a revival of biological systematics based on phylogeny.

Crespo was among the first researchers to detect cryptic lineages in lichenized fungi and recognize their importance for accurate estimates of species diversity. Her work demonstrated that phenotypic features of a species do not always reflect the true genetic diversity present, highlighting the high phenotypic plasticity in lichen-forming fungi. These investigations have changed the scientific view of species delimitation in lichen fungi.

In the 1970s, she pioneered techniques for monitoring atmospheric pollution and environmental quality using lichens in Spain. Her research also includes studies on potential pharmacological applications of lichens. As of 2018, Crespo had supervised twelve graduate students and numerous postdoctoral researchers, and had published more than 170 scientific papers, establishing herself as an influential figure in modern lichenology.

== Awards and recognition ==
Crespo's scientific contributions have been widely recognized:

- Medal of the Menéndez Pelayo International University (1993)
- Research Associate of The Field Museum (since 2005)
- Election to the Royal Spanish Academy of Sciences (2012)
- Acharius Medal from the International Association for Lichenology (2012)
- Ranked among the top 1% of highly cited researchers in the 2013 list from Thomson Reuters

The fungal genera Crespoa, Cresponea, and Cresporhaphis were named in her honour, in addition to several fungal species: Coelocaulon crespoae Barreno & Vázquez (1982); Rinodina crespoae Giralt & H.Mayrhofer (1994); Xanthoparmelia crespoae Elix, Louwhoff & M.C.Molina (2000); Polycoccum crespoae Váczi & D.Hawksw. (2001); Thelotrema crespoae Mangold, Elix & Lumbsch (2008); Lichenodiplis crespoae Pérez-Ort. & V.Atienza (2009); and Bunodophoron crespoae Soto-Med., M.Prieto & Wedin (2018).

The standard author abbreviation A.Crespo is used to indicate this person as the author when citing a botanical name.

== See also ==
- Category:Taxa named by Ana Crespo
