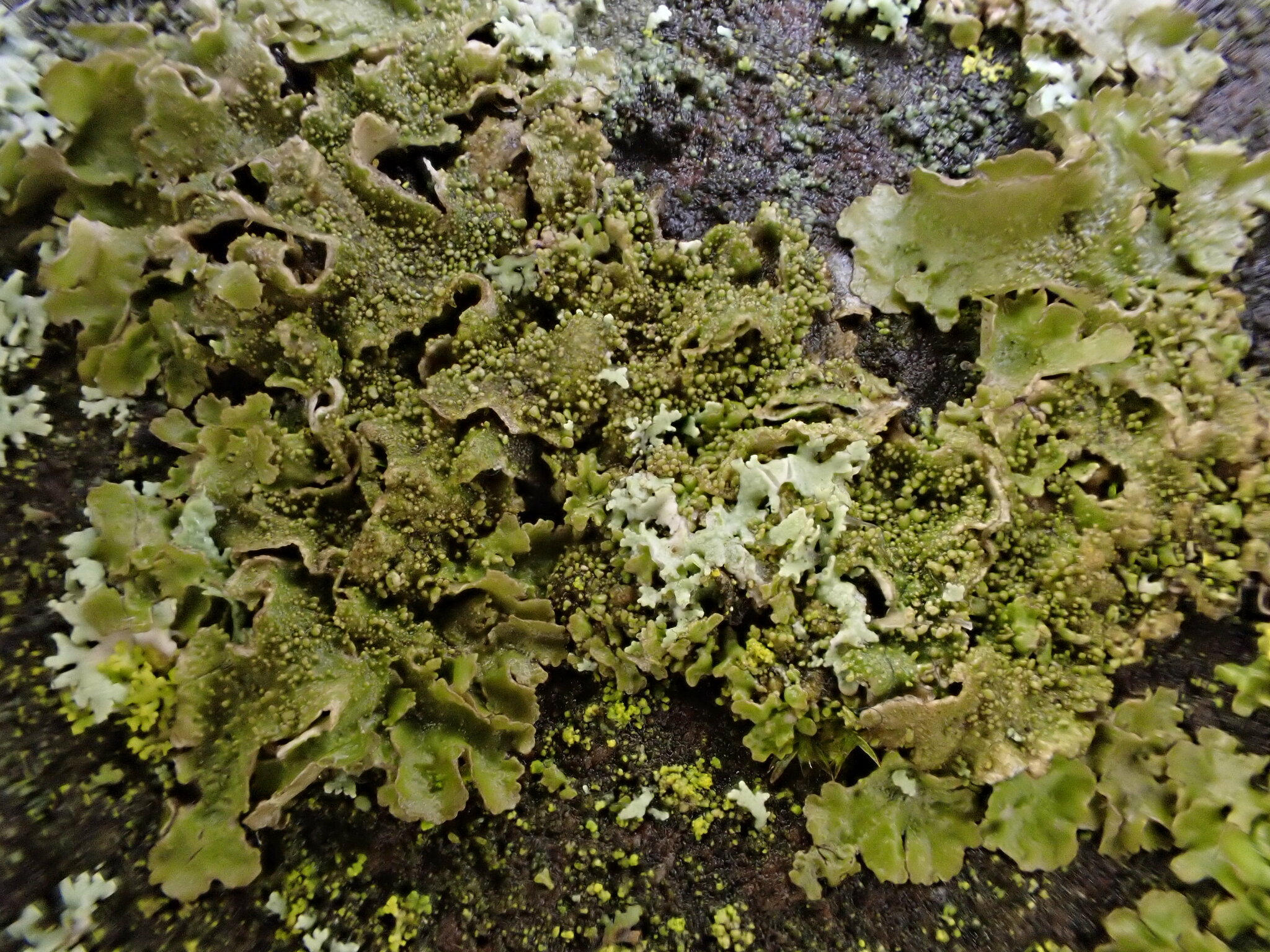

Conservation status
- Secure (NatureServe)

Scientific classification
- Kingdom: Fungi
- Division: Ascomycota
- Class: Lecanoromycetes
- Order: Lecanorales
- Family: Parmeliaceae
- Genus: Melanohalea
- Species: M. exasperatula

Binomial name
- Melanohalea exasperatula (Nyl.) O.Blanco, A.Crespo, Divakar, Essl., D.Hawksw. & Lumbsch (2004)

Synonyms
- List: Parmelia exasperatula Nyl. (1873); Imbricaria exasperatula (Nyl.) Arnold (1874); Parmelia olivacea f. exasperatula (Nyl.) Blomb. & Forssell (1880); Parmelia aspidota var. exasperatula (Nyl.) P.Syd. (1887); Parmelia olivacea var. exasperatula (Nyl.) Boistel (1896); Parmelia olivacea subsp. exasperatula (Nyl.) Boistel (1903); Melanelia exasperatula (Nyl.) Essl. (1978); Imbricaria olivacea f. papulosa Anzi (1868); Parmelia papulosa (Anzi) Vain. (1888)

= Melanohalea exasperatula =

Species of lichen

Melanohalea exasperatula, commonly known as the lustrous camouflage lichen or lustrous brown-shield, is a species of corticolous (bark-dwelling) foliose lichen in the family Parmeliaceae. It has a widespread global distribution and is common in both Europe and northern North America. Its thallus can grow up to 5 cm (2 in) in diameter, with marginal lobes up to 5 mm (3/16 in) broad. The upper surface is pale olive-green to red-brown, with isidia (propagules of vegetative reproduction) that are unbranched, inflated, and hollow. It can be distinguished from similar species by the shape and structure of these isidia. The lower surface of the thallus is pale tan to pale brown with scattered, pale rhizines. Apothecia (sexual fruiting bodies) are uncommon, while pycnidia (asexual fruiting bodies) and secondary metabolites are not found in this species. The lack of defensive chemicals makes it vulnerable to grazing by slugs and snails. The evolutionary history of M. exasperatula is linked to major climatic events during the Miocene and Pliocene epochs.

== Taxonomy ==
The Finnish lichenologist William Nylander first scientifically described the lichen in 1873, classifying it in the genus Parmelia. He briefly described the lichen as: "Perhaps a subspecies of P. exasperata, but thinner, with a smaller thallus and densely packed small linear lobes." He further noted that the type specimen, collected by Johan Petter Norrlin, was found growing on bark in Etelä-Häme (Hollola, Finland). In 1978, Theodore Esslinger transferred it to the newly circumscribed genus Melanelia as part of a revision of the cetrarioid lichens. In 2004, a molecular phylogenetics-informed restructuring of Melanelia into more natural monophyletic groups led to the reclassification of the species. Two new genera were proposed: Melanelixia and Melanohalea. The taxon was transferred to Melanohalea, along with 18 other brown parmelioid species that are primarily distributed on bark and wood in the Northern Hemisphere.

The taxon Parmelia papulosa, first described by Martino Anzi in 1868 (as Imbricaria olivacea f. papulosa) and later transferred to Parmelia by Edvard Vainio in 1888, is a synonym of Melanohalea exasperatula. Although it was published a few years earlier than Nylander's Parmelia exasperatula, it is nevertheless not a validly published name, as Camille Montagne had already used the name Parmelia papulosa for a different taxon in 1842.

The species epithet exasperatula derives from the Latin word exasperatus ('roughened') with the diminutive suffix -ula, meaning 'somewhat roughened', referring to the roughness of the thallus surface (exasperatis). Common names used to refer to the Melanohalea exasperatula include "lustrous camouflage lichen" and "lustrous brown-shield".

== Evolutionary history ==
The genus Melanohalea, including M. exasperatula, underwent significant diversification primarily during the Miocene and Pliocene epochs, much earlier than the Pleistocene glacial cycles. This diversification is linked to major climatic changes and the formation of new habitats. Bayesian skyline plot analyses—a method that uses genetic data to estimate historical population sizes by analyzing patterns of DNA differences between individuals—indicate that population expansions for M. exasperatula occurred during the Pleistocene but predated the Last Glacial Maximum. The population growth for this species began approximately 200,000 years before present, during the Saalian Pleniglacial cycle. Melanohalea exasperatula's current distribution and population structure are the result of both ancient diversification events and more recent ecological adaptations.

== Genetic diversity and population structure ==
Genetic diversity in Melanohalea exasperatula is assessed through two main metrics: haplotype diversity and nucleotide diversity. Haplotype diversity measures the uniqueness of a particular genetic sequence (haplotype) within a population. High haplotype diversity means there are many different genetic sequences present, indicating a high level of genetic variability. Nucleotide diversity measures the average differences at the nucleotide level between pairs of DNA sequences in a population. It gives an indication of how much genetic variation there is within the population. Moderate levels of both haplotype and nucleotide diversity in M. exasperatula suggest that the species has sufficient genetic variation to adapt to various environments, supporting its wide distribution. A genealogical concordance method used in the study found strong evidence for previously unrecognized species-level lineages within traditional morphology-based species, including M. exasperatula. This implies that there may be cryptic diversity within what is currently recognized as M. exasperatula, necessitating further morphological and genetic studies to fully resolve the species boundaries.

== Description ==
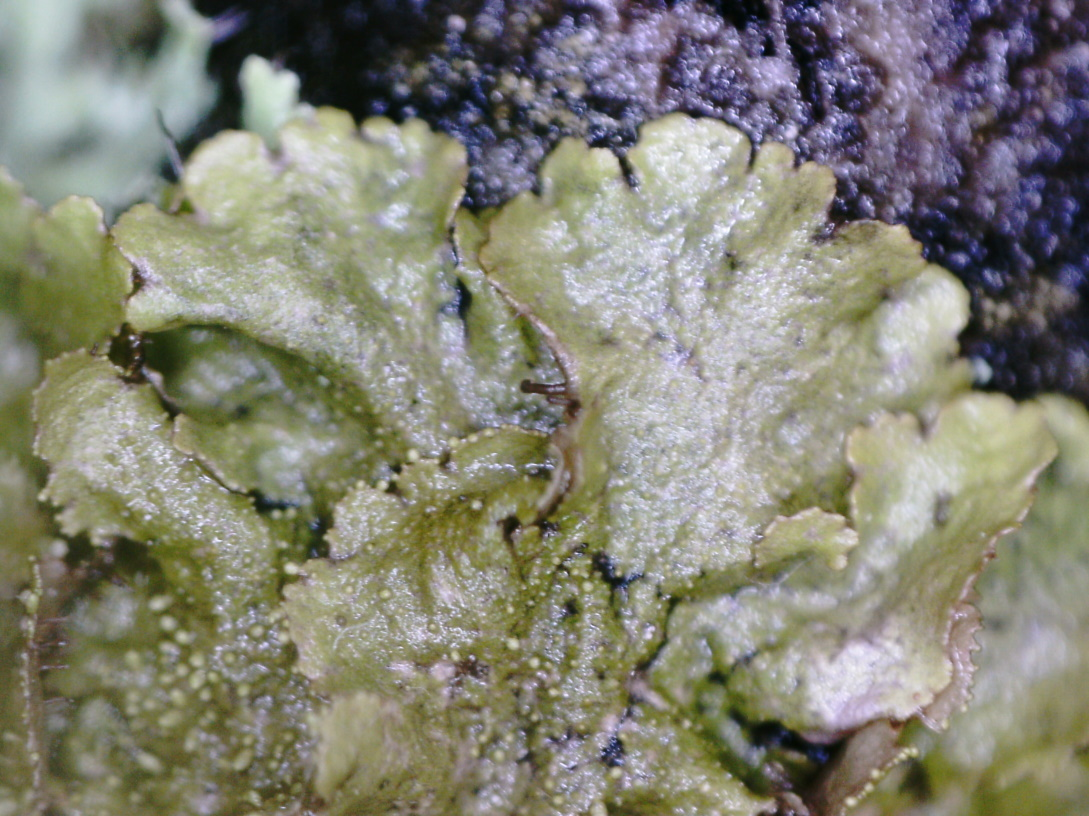
Closeup of lobes

Melanohalea exasperatula is a foliose lichen with a thallus (the main body of the lichen) that can grow up to 5 cm (2 in) in diameter. The thallus is generally closely appressed (flattened and pressed closely to the substrate) in the centre and is relatively thin. The marginal lobes, which are the leaf-like structures around the edge of the thallus, can be up to 5 mm broad and are often raised at the margins and wavy with irregularly incised (cut or notched) edges.

The shiny upper surface of the thallus varies in colour from pale olive-green to dark olive-brown or red-brown and becomes somewhat transparent when wet. This species is isidiate, meaning it has isidia, which are small outgrowths on the surface. The isidia of Melanohalea exasperatula are unbranched, swollen, and hollow, often becoming club-shaped (clavate) or spoon-shaped (spathulate). Eventually, they develop into divided lobules (small lobes) and often lie flat (decumbent), oriented in all directions. The isidia are very dense towards the centre of the thallus. Up to 2 mm long, they are roughly spherical when young but become flatter with age. They develop from cylindrical papillae (small, rounded growths) on the thallus surface.

The lower surface of the thallus ranges from pale tan to pale brown or may be the same colour as the upper surface, with the central part being dark brown. The rhizines (root-like structures) are scattered and pale.

Apothecia, the fruiting bodies of the lichen, are rare in this species and measure 2–3 mm in diameter. The disc of the apothecia is concave and pale red-brown, with an uneven, isidiate margin. The ascospores (reproductive spores) are ellipsoidal and measure 8–10 by 3.5–8 μm. Pycnidia, which are structures that produce asexual spores, do not occur in this species. Chemical analysis using thin-layer chromatography has revealed no secondary metabolites (lichen products) in Melanohalea exasperatula.

=== Similar species ===
Melanohalea elegantula is somewhat similar in appearance to M. exasperatula, but the former species can be distinguished by its isidia, which are cylindrical and compact, and its thicker and usually darker thallus.

== Habitat and distribution ==
Melanohalea exasperatula has a widespread global distribution, and occurs in Africa, Asia, Europe, and North America. It is widely distributed in Europe, having been recorded in 38 countries there. In North America, M. exasperatula's range extends north to Alaska and Arctic regions, and includes the Great Lakes area, the Pacific Northwest, the Rocky Mountains, and extends south to the southwestern United States. It does not occur in Mexico. It is suspected of having a circumpolar distribution, although its presence in Asia is not well known. It is also known from Macaronesia and from Central America.

Melanohalea exasperatula typically grows on the trunks and branches of nutrient-rich, broad-leaved trees, particularly sycamore (Acer pseudoplatanus). It can also be found on open hillsides, occasionally growing on rocks (saxicolous), walls, and wooden fence rails under trees. This lichen is often found in relatively polluted areas and appears to be increasing in such environments. Additionally, it can grow directly on leaves (foliicolous), with young lobules establishing on spruce needles. Melanohalea exasperatula may have a high requirement for nitrogen or phosphate. In Greenland, it occurs on the bark of dwarf shrubs and the wood of Picea, and on both siliceous and basaltic rocks, usually in nutrient-enriched habitats.

== Ecology ==
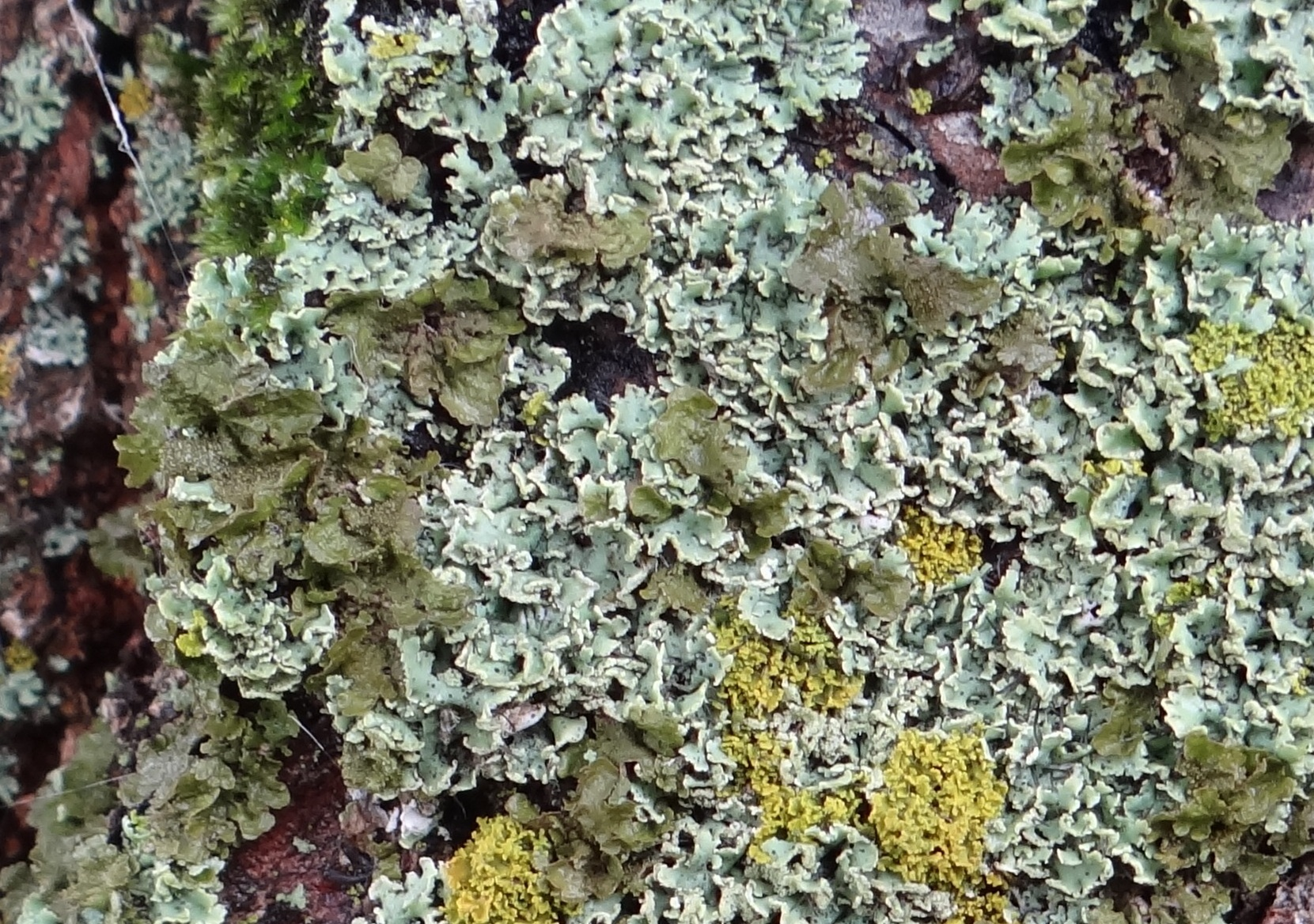
Melanohalea exasperatula (green), growing amongst Physcia dubia (light green/grey), Polycauliona candelaria (yellow) and moss

The distribution patterns of M. exasperatula are influenced more by present-day environmental conditions in different regions than by reproductive strategies. This species, along with M. elegantula, is linked to eutrophication and air pollution, suggesting a possible need for environments with high nitrogen or phosphate levels.

Melanohalea exasperatula shows a significant ability for dispersal and is commonly found in nutrient-rich habitats, including urban areas and places with anthropogenic disturbances. The lichen's intercontinental distribution suggests effective long-distance dispersal capabilities. This species, along with M. elegantula, shows potential for broad geographic spread, which is notable as it contrasts with other Melanohalea lineages that have more restricted distributions.

Crittendenia coppinsii is a lichenicolous (lichen-dwelling) fungus that has been recorded on several collections of Melanohalea exasperatula in Europe. Evidence suggests that the fungus goes through an asexual yeast phase in its life cycle, because DNA sequences of the fungus have been found on completely asymptomatic specimens of M. exasperatula. Another lichenicolous fungus, Stagonospora exasperatulae, exclusively parasitizes M. exasperatula.

Melanohalea exasperatula lacks secondary metabolites, making it highly susceptible to grazing by gastropods. In both laboratory and field experiments, gastropods showed a strong preference for this species over others that produce chemical deterrents. This preference suggests that the absence of chemical defenses in M. exasperatula influences its distribution and abundance, leading to heavier grazing in natural habitats. Demonstrating the impact of herbivory on lichen community dynamics and ecological niches, M. exasperatula is as a consequence often found in more sun-exposed areas with lower gastropod activity.
