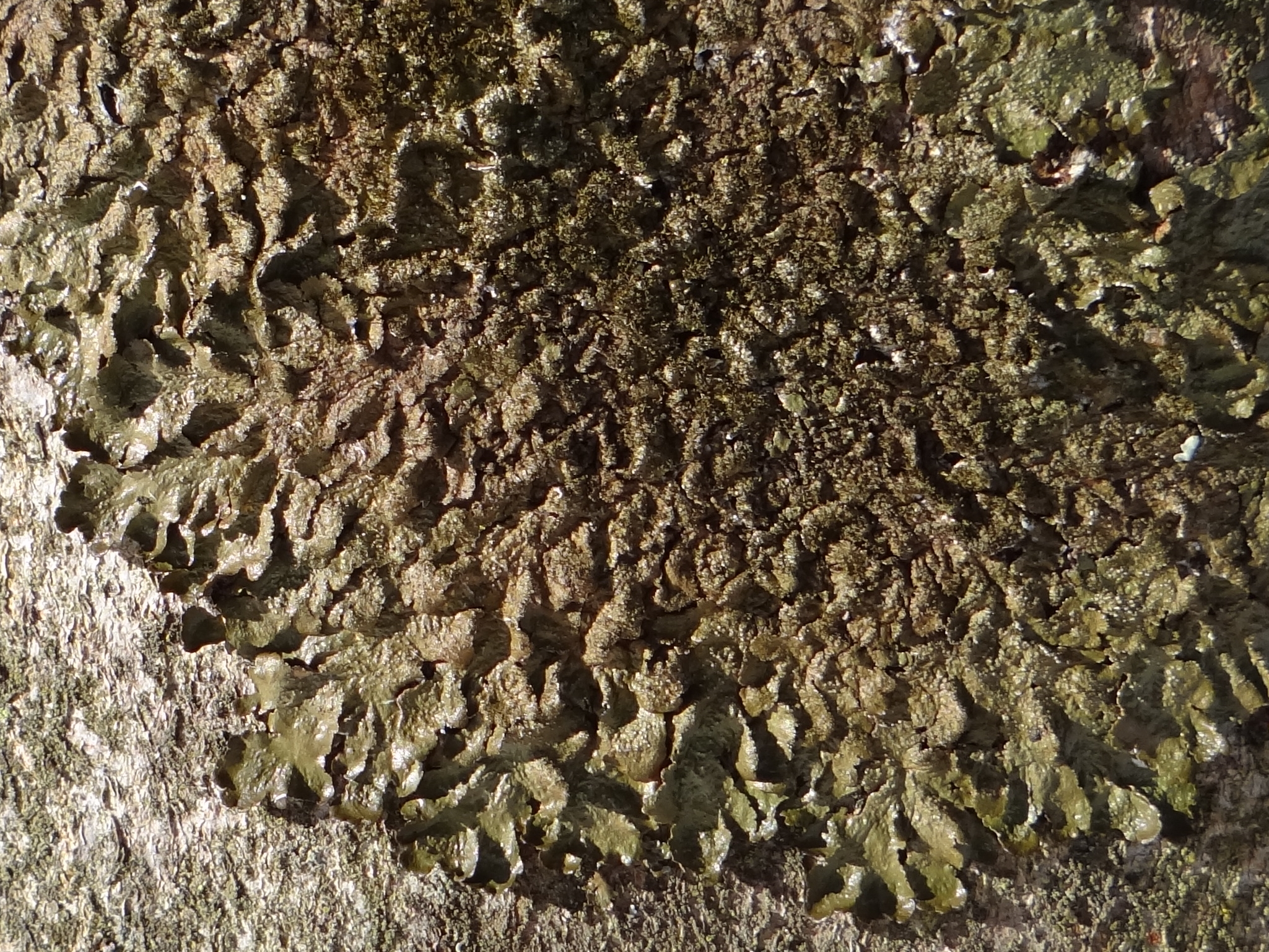
- In Poland's Western Tatras

Conservation status
- Secure (NatureServe)

Scientific classification
- Kingdom: Fungi
- Division: Ascomycota
- Class: Lecanoromycetes
- Order: Lecanorales
- Family: Parmeliaceae
- Genus: Melanelixia
- Species: M. fuliginosa

Binomial name
- Melanelixia fuliginosa (Fr. ex Duby) O.Blanco, A.Crespo, Divakar, Essl., D.Hawksw. & Lumbsch (2004)

Synonyms
- List: Parmelia olivacea ? fuliginosa Fr. ex Duby (1830); Parmelia fuliginosa (Fr. ex Duby) Nyl. (1868); Imbricaria fuliginosa (Fr. ex Duby) Arnold (1870); Parmelia glabra subsp. fuliginosa (Fr. ex Duby) Vain. (1881); Parmelia subaurifera var. fuliginosa (Fr. ex Duby) H.Olivier (1882); Parmelia glabratula var. fuliginosa (Fr. ex Duby) Grummann (1963); Parmelia glabratula subsp. fuliginosa (Fr. ex Duby) J.R.Laundon (1965); Melanelia fuliginosa (Fr. ex Duby) Essl. (1987); Melanelia glabratula subsp. fuliginosa (Fr. ex Duby) P.M.McCarthy & M.E.Mitch. (1988); Imbricaria olivacea ? laetevirens Flot. (1850); Parmelia fuliginosa var. laetevirens (Flot.) Nyl. (1867); Parmelia olivacea f. laetevirens (Flot.) Blomb. & Forssell (1880); Imbricaria fuliginosa f. laetevirens (Flot.) Arnold (1882); Parmelia prolixa subvar. laetevirens (Flot.) Boistel (1903); Parmelia laetevirens (Flot.) F.Rosend. (1907); Parmelia glabratula var. laetevirens (Flot.) Grummann (1963); Melanelia glabratula f. laetevirens (Flot.) S.Y.Kondr. (1993); Parmelia fuliginosa f. aterrima Wedd. (1875); Parmelia prolixa subvar. aterrima (Wedd.) Boistel (1903); Parmelia prolixa var. aterrima (Wedd.) Maheu & Werner (1934); Parmelia glabratula f. aterrima (Wedd.) Grummann (1963)

= Melanelixia fuliginosa =

Species of lichen

Melanelixia fuliginosa is a species of foliose lichen in the family Parmeliaceae, commonly found growing on siliceous rocks in humid, temperate regions of Europe and possibly parts of Asia. It forms dark brown to blackish rosettes up to 15 cm in diameter with small overlapping lobes that bear numerous tiny, cylindrical outgrowths (isidia) on their surface. The lichen primarily reproduces by vegetative means when these isidia break off and establish new colonies. Originally described by French botanist Jean Étienne Duby in 1830 as a variety of another lichen, it has undergone several taxonomic changes, being assigned to various genera including Parmelia and Melanelia before its current classification in Melanelixia in 2004. Although historically thought to occur in North America, recent studies suggest true M. fuliginosa may be restricted to Europe, with North American specimens now identified as the closely related Melanelixia glabratula, which prefers bark rather than rock substrates.

== Taxonomy ==
Melanelixia fuliginosa was originally described by the French botanist Jean Étienne Duby in 1830 (attributed to Elias Fries) as Parmelia olivacea var. fuliginosa, a variety of another lichen. Duby's protologue placed the taxon as varietas γ of Parmelia olivacea, characterising var. fuliginosa as having a thallus thallo punctis elevatis fuliginosis confertissimis adsperso — 'densely sprinkled with sooty, raised punctae' — and citing specimens gathered on siliceous cliffs near Bernay and Vire in Normandy, France.

In 1870, the lichen was raised to species rank by Arnold under the name Imbricaria fuliginosa. Later authors recombined it into the large genus Parmelia: e.g. as Parmelia fuliginosa in the 19th century. During the 20th century, there was some confusion with an unrelated species Sticta fuliginosa that had a similar epithet; to avoid this, Parmelia fuliginosa (Fr. ex Duby) was sometimes cited with "non (Ach.) Schaer." to distinguish it from Acharius's Sticta name.

By the late 1900s, P. fuliginosa was included in a subgroup of brown Parmelia lichens. Ted Esslinger segregated these into the genus Melanelia in the 1970s, and he formally transferred this species to Melanelia fuliginosa in 1987. Some authorities during that time treated fuliginosa as not a distinct species but rather part of a species complex: Jack Laundon considered it a subspecies of Parmelia glabratula, naming it Parmelia glabratula subsp. fuliginosa. Thus, older British literature sometimes refers to P. glabratula subsp. fuliginosa for saxicolous (rock-dwelling) specimens.

There was long-standing debate over whether the dark, rock-dwelling form and the paler, bark-dwelling form represented one species or two. This was resolved by a molecular phylogenetics study in 2011, which showed two well-supported lineages. As a result, the bark-dwelling taxon was separated and elevated to Melanelixia glabratula in 2011, while M. fuliginosa was retained for the darker saxicolous species. Melanelixia glabratula was originally described by Pierre Lamy (1878) as Parmelia fuliginosa subsp. glabratula, and is now recognized as a distinct species closely related to M. fuliginosa.

In the broader classification, Melanelixia fuliginosa belongs to the parmelioid lichens, a clade of foliose lichens in the large Parmeliaceae. The delimitation of Parmelia sensu lato (in the wide sense) was controversial in the late 20th century: some lichenologists split it into many smaller genera based on thallus colour and morphology (e.g. Hale 1974; Elix 1994), while others preferred a broad Parmelia (e.g. Purvis et al. 1992). Molecular studies ended this debate, supporting the separation of distinct genera. In 2004, the genus Melanelixia was established for a clade of the "brown Parmelia" group, including M. fuliginosa and its allies. The new genus was distinguished from the residual Melanelia and the related genus Melanohalea on molecular and morphological grounds. Since 2004, the accepted name of this species has been Melanelixia fuliginosa, with Melanelia fuliginosa and Parmelia fuliginosa as well-known synonyms.

== Description ==
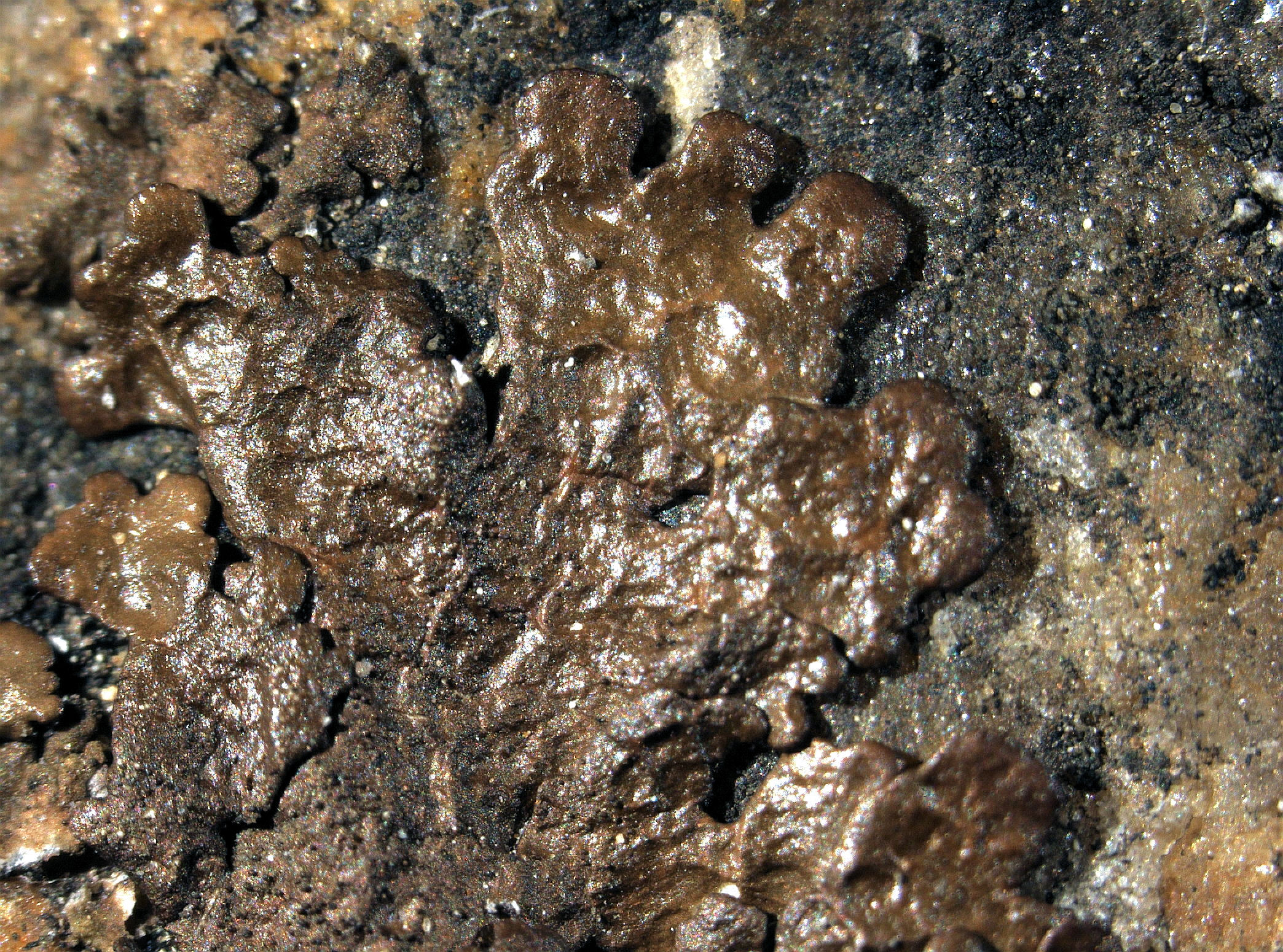
Closeup of lobes with slightly upturned, rounded tips

The lichen forms a foliose (leaf-like) thallus in rosettes up to about 10–15 cm in diameter. The individual lobes are small (typically 1–4 mm wide), contiguous to overlapping, with rounded tips that may be slightly upturned. The upper surface is greenish-brown when wet, drying to dark brown or blackish in strong light, and is usually smooth to faintly wrinkled and shiny (especially near the lobe ends). The lobe margins and surfaces bear abundant isidia – tiny cylindrical outgrowths of the thallus. These isidia are often branched and coralloid in form, and can detach easily; when they break off they leave behind distinct white scars or pits on the cortex. The lower surface of the thallus is black to dark brown, with a paler brown margin, and has simple, mostly unbranched rhizines (root-like attachments) up to about 1 mm long that anchor the lichen to its substrate. The thallus is heteromerous (with a distinct algal layer) and contains a green chlorococcoid photobiont (algal partner) in the upper cortex.

Reproduction in M. fuliginosa is primarily vegetative by dispersal of isidia, which can break off and establish new colonies. Sexual reproduction is uncommon – many thalli lack fruiting bodies. When present, the apothecia are small disk-like structures up to 5–6 mm across. The apothecia are lecanorine, meaning they have a rim of thallus tissue; in this species the apothecial margin is often adorned with isidia as well. The apothecial disk is usually concave to flat, dark red-brown to black, and without perforations. Inside the apothecia, the asci contain eight ascospores of the usual one-celled type for Parmeliaceae. The ascospores are hyaline (colourless), ellipsoid, and measure roughly 10–14 × 5–8 μm. The asci themselves have a blue amyloid inner layer in iodine (Lecanora-type asci). Pycnidia (asexual conidiomata) are rare on M. fuliginosa; when present they appear as tiny immersed black dots and produce conidia that are bacilliform (rod-shaped), and about 6–8 × 1 μm in size. The conidia often have slightly swollen ends and are released to serve as another means of propagation (analogous to fungal "spores").

=== Chemistry ===
Like many parmelioid lichens, Melanelixia fuliginosa produces several secondary metabolites (lichen products) in its tissues. The medulla contains lecanoric acid and 5‑methoxylecanoric acid as major substances. These are orcinol-type depsides that can be detected by standard chemical spot tests: a medulla scraping is C+ (red) and also KC+ (red). The medulla is usually K–, but if an orange pigment is present in the lower medulla, a K test produces a purple-violet colour. This reaction is caused by an anthraquinone pigment, likely rhodophyscin (or a related anthraquinone such as skyrin), which occurs as a minor compound in some specimens. Other spot tests are negative (P–, UV–), indicating the absence of lichen substances like depsidones or usnic acid. Thin-layer chromatography has been used to confirm the chemical profile of M. fuliginosa, revealing the above compounds and occasionally unidentified minor substances.

== Habitat and distribution ==
Melanelixia fuliginosa is chiefly a saxicolous lichen – it grows on rock. It shows a preference for siliceous (acidic) rocks such as granite, sandstone, and other acidic outcrops. Typical habitats include boulders, rocky cliffs, scree, and stone walls in moorland or montane areas, especially in regions with clean air and ample rainfall. In these settings it can form extensive dark brown patches on rock faces, often alongside other acid-rock lichens. The species is described as mainly silicicolous (occurring on silica-rich rock). It is usually found in semi-exposed to well-lit conditions; too much deep shade inhibits its growth, while full sun can cause the thallus to become very dark and compact. Although primarily found on rock, M. fuliginosa has occasionally been recorded on the bark of trees or on old wood (such as fence posts or dead trunks). Such corticolous (bark-growing) occurrences are more common in humid, coastal or montane woodlands. However, many bark populations historically identified as M. fuliginosa have turned out to be Melanelixia glabratula, which favours bark and has a slightly different appearance.

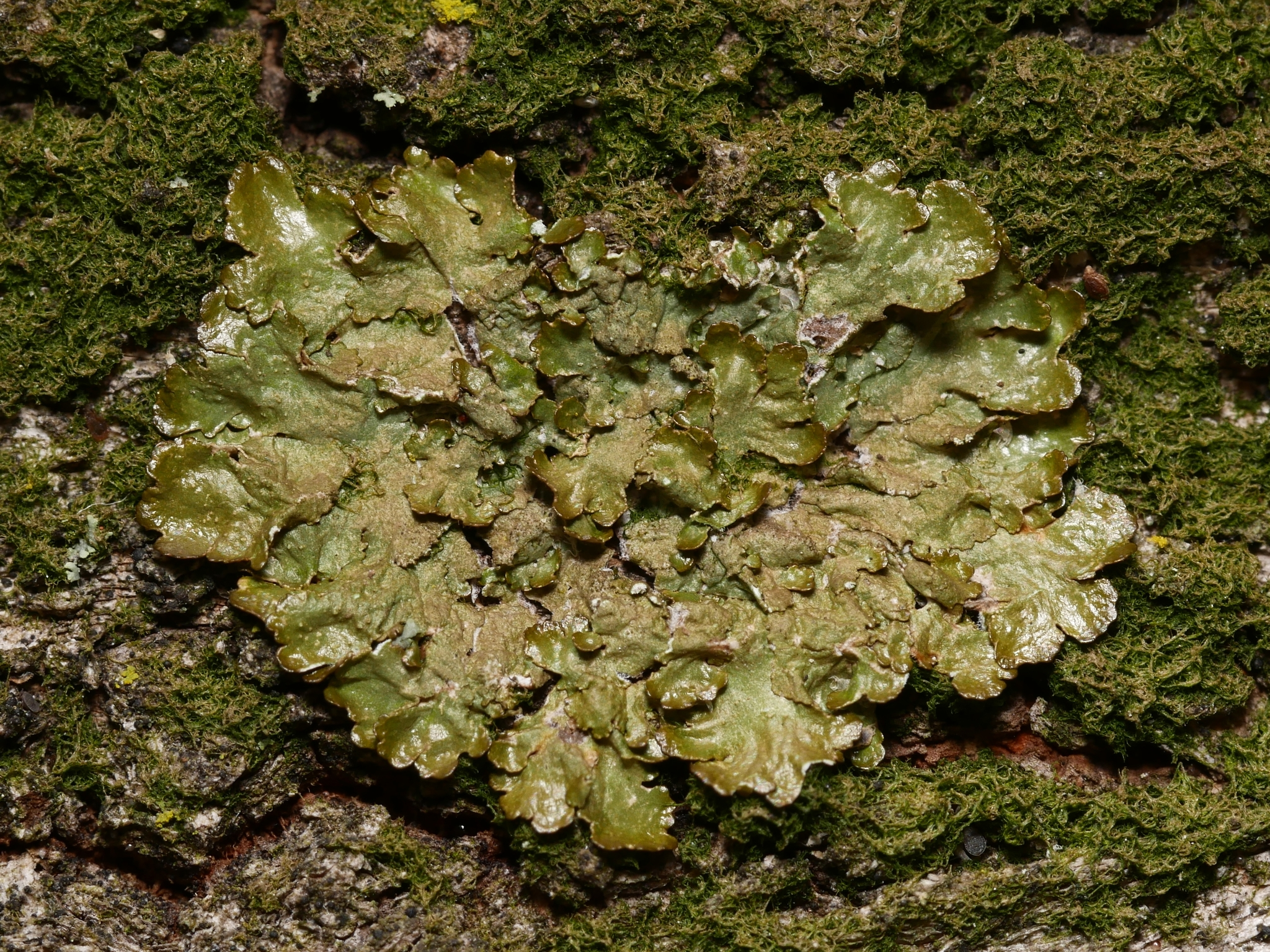
Melanelixia glabratula, shown here, is a North American lookalike that grows on bark.

In terms of geography, Melanelixia fuliginosa has a broad Northern Hemisphere distribution. In the wide sense (before separation of M. glabratula), it was regarded as an almost circumpolar species, found across Europe, Asia, and North America in temperate to boreal zones. It occurs on both bark and rock in its range, favouring fairly humid climates and acidic substrates. M. fuliginosa is widespread in Europe, where it is especially frequent in northern and western regions. For example, it is common in the British Isles (particularly Scotland, Ireland and western England/Wales) on siliceous rocks, and in Fennoscandia and the Alps. Its European range extends from subarctic areas in Scandinavia and Russia down to mountainous parts of southern Europe (e.g. the Pyrenees, Italian Alps, and Balkan Mountains), though it is less common in dry lowland Mediterranean areas. In Asia, the species (in a broad sense) has been reported in temperate parts of Russia, East Asia, and Central Asia – for instance, in Siberia and high elevations of Korea and Japan (often on rock outcrops in cool climates). Some records also exist from North Africa (e.g. Atlas Mountains) and other outlying regions.

Reports of M. fuliginosa from North America have undergone re-evaluation. It was historically cited from both western North America (the Pacific Northwest, Rocky Mountains) and eastern North America (New England and the Appalachians), usually on siliceous rocks in upland areas. These populations were long assumed to be the same species as the European M. fuliginosa. Recent molecular and taxonomic studies, however, indicate that true Melanelixia fuliginosa may be absent from North America. Esslinger noted that North American reports of Melanelia/Melanelixia fuliginosa were misidentifications of M. glabratula or other look-alikes. In light of this, North American lichen checklists now exclude M. fuliginosa in the strict sense, treating the prevalent camouflage lichens on rocks as M. glabratula or related species.

Ecologically, Melanelixia fuliginosa tends to be an indicator of relatively unpolluted, acidic environments. It tolerates cold and wet conditions well, and can be found from sea level (on coastal rocks) up to alpine zones (on exposed summits) as long as the substrate is suitable. In areas where it occurs, it contributes to rock surface communities and provides microhabitats for small invertebrates. It is not considered endangered. In the UK, for example, it is rated of Least Concern due to its broad distribution and commonality. However, distinguishing it from M. glabratula in the field requires attention to substrate and subtle morphological differences.
