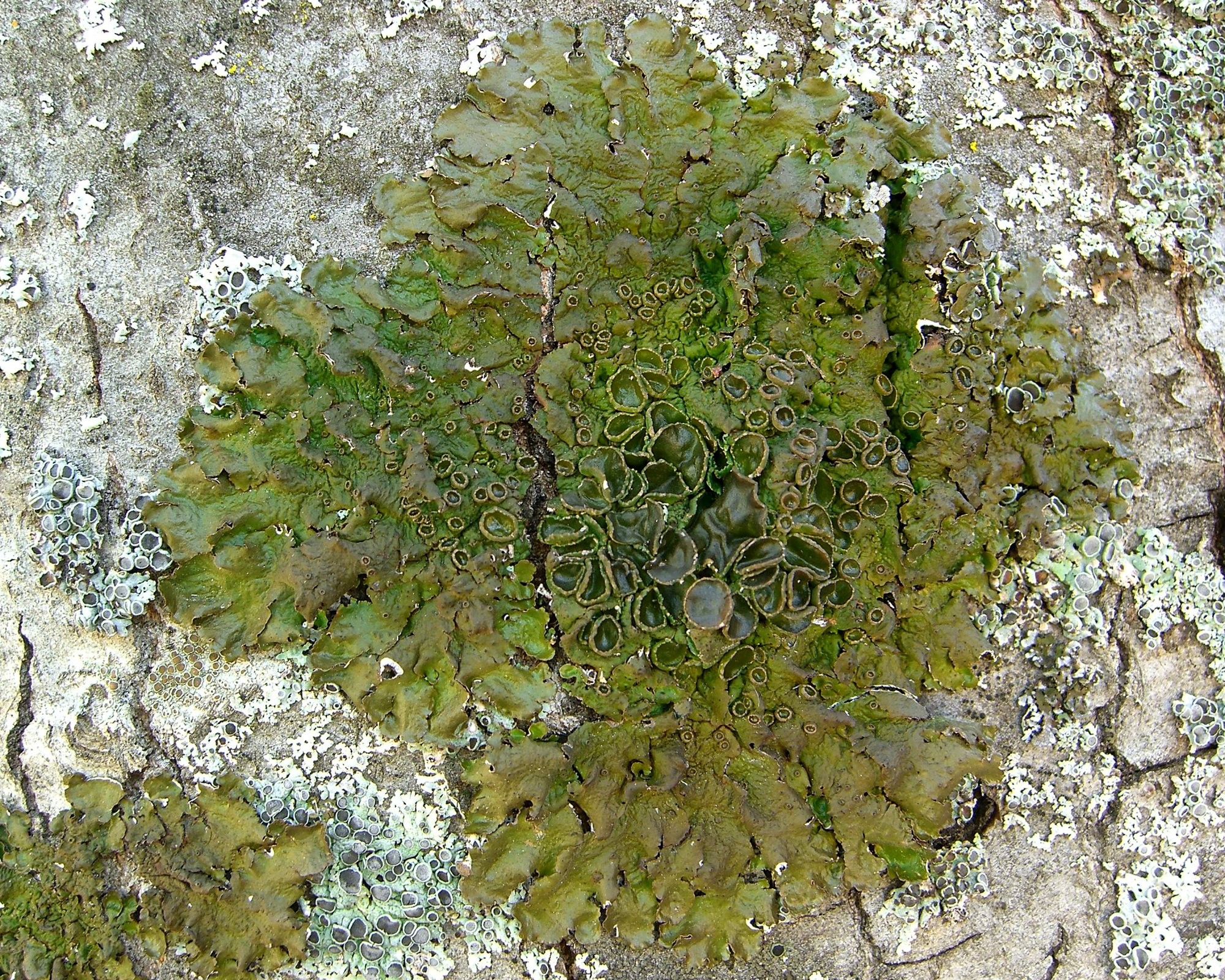

Scientific classification
- Kingdom: Fungi
- Division: Ascomycota
- Class: Lecanoromycetes
- Order: Lecanorales
- Family: Parmeliaceae
- Genus: Melanelixia
- Species: M. californica

Binomial name
- Melanelixia californica A.Crespo & Divakar (2010)
- Holotype: Palomar Mountain State Park, California

= Melanelixia californica =

Species of lichen

Melanelixia californica, the California camouflage lichen, is a species of foliose lichen in the family Parmeliaceae. It was first described in 2010 after molecular studies revealed that what was thought to be the European species Melanelixia glabra in North America was actually a distinct species. The lichen forms olive-green, leaf-like growths up to 6 cm (2.4 in) across and is characterized by its sparse transparent surface hairs and disk-shaped fruiting bodies. It is found primarily in southern California, where it grows mainly on oak trees in Mediterranean climate zones at elevations ranging from 640–1,700 m (2,100–5,580 ft), though it has also been reported from Oregon's Cascade–Siskiyou National Monument.

== Taxonomy ==
Melanelixia californica was first scientifically described in 2010 by the lichenologists Ana Crespo and Pradeep Divakar. The species was previously considered part of Melanelixia glabra before molecular phylogenetics studies revealed it to be a distinct species. Analysis of nuclear ITS and mitochondrial SSU rDNA gene regions showed that the North American populations of what was thought to be M. glabra were genetically distinct from European and Turkish specimens, forming their own monophyletic clade.

The species is most closely related to two Indian species, M. glabroides and M. villosella, rather than to M. glabra from Europe. While M. californica shares some morphological similarities with M. glabra, it can be distinguished by its shorter and sparser hyaline cortical hairs (up to 20 μm long), slightly larger ascospores (14.5–17 by 7.5–9.5 μm), and smaller conidia (9–9.5 by 1 μm). The species is also geographically isolated, being found only in western North America, primarily in California. The holotype specimen was collected from fallen branches of Quercus kelloggii in Palomar State Park, San Diego County, California at an elevation of 1,587 m (5,207 ft). The specific epithet californica refers to the state where the type specimen was collected and where the species is commonly found.

The discovery of M. californica as a distinct species exemplifies a broader pattern seen in some lichen families where Mediterranean flora shows similar but distinct species between California and Europe, suggesting parallel evolution in these separated but climatically similar regions. Melanelixia ahtii is a closely related sister species.

== Description ==
Melanelixia californica is a foliose (leaf-like) lichen that grows in flat, overlapping layers adhering closely to its substrate. The thallus (main body) typically reaches 5–6 cm (2–2 3/8 in) across, with individual lobes measuring 3–6 mm (1/8–1/4 in) wide. These lobes have rounded tips, overlap each other, and lie flat against the surface they grow on.

The upper surface is olive green and has a wrinkled, mottled appearance. It lacks several features common to other lichens, such as isidia (coral-like outgrowths), soredia (powdery reproductive structures), and pseudocyphellae (small pores). The surface has a distinctive feature called a pored or fenestrated epicortex, meaning its outer layer contains microscopic holes. While the surface may have sparse, very short transparent hairs (up to 20 μm long), these are often absent except on the edges of the fruiting bodies. The medulla (internal layer) is white, while the lower surface is black with a brown margin extending up to 3 mm (1/8 in) wide. Simple black rhizines (root-like attachments) with white tips anchor the lichen to its substrate.

The species reproduces sexually through apothecia (disk-shaped fruiting bodies) that are 2–5 mm (1/16–3/16 in) in diameter. These structures sit directly on the thallus surface and have brown disks that become flat or slightly convex with age. The apothecia contain asci (spore-producing cells) that each produce eight colorless, ellipsoid spores measuring 14.5–17 by 7.5–9.5 μm. Melanelixia californica also produces structures called pycnidia, which are small, black, immersed chambers that produce rod-shaped conidia (asexual spores) measuring 9–9.5 by 1 μm.

When tested with chemical spot tests commonly used in lichen identification, the cortex shows no reaction with potassium hydroxide solution (K−) or nitric acid (HNO_{3}−). The medulla reacts with calcium hypochlorite to produce a rose-red color. The only lichen product detected through thin-layer chromatography is lecanoric acid.

== Habitat and distribution ==
Melanelixia californica is known primarily from southern California in the United States. The species is primarily epiphytic, meaning it grows on trees, with a strong preference for various oak species. It has been documented growing on several oak species including California black oak (Quercus kelloggii), coast live oak (Q. agrifolia), California scrub oak (Q. dumosa), blue oak (Q. douglasii), and interior live oak (Q. wislizeni). It occasionally occurs on bigleaf maple (Acer macrophyllum) and has rarely been found growing on rocks.

The species has been collected at various elevations throughout its range, from relatively low elevations around 640 m (2,100 ft) to higher mountainous areas up to about 1,700 m (5,600 ft). Documented locations include:

- Palomar State Park, San Diego County
- San Joaquin Experimental Range, Madera County
- Plumas National Forest, Plumas County
- Sequoia National Forest, Kern County
- Areas near Monticello Dam, Solano County

Melanelixia californica represents a case of regional endemism, being part of the distinctive Mediterranean flora of California. While it was previously thought to be the same species as the European Melanelixia glabra, genetic studies have shown it to be a distinct species that evolved separately in North America, demonstrating a pattern of parallel evolution between Mediterranean climate regions of California and Europe. The species typically occurs in oak woodland-grassland habitats, which are characteristic of California's Mediterranean climate zones. Its known distribution was expanded somewhat when it was reported from the Cascade–Siskiyou National Monument in Oregon in 2018.
