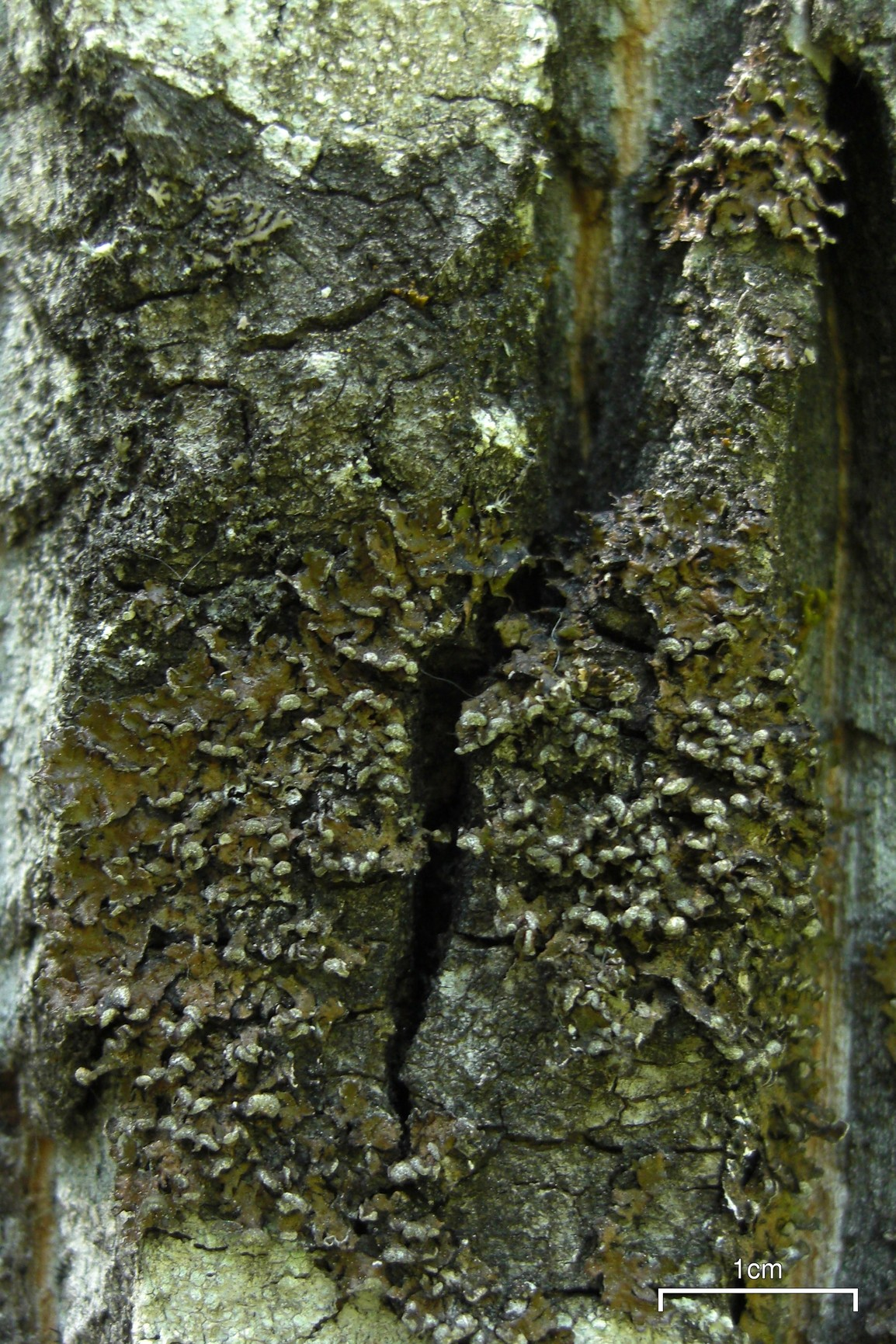
- near the Dunevan crossing in Alberta, Canada

Scientific classification
- Domain: Eukaryota
- Kingdom: Fungi
- Division: Ascomycota
- Class: Lecanoromycetes
- Order: Lecanorales
- Family: Parmeliaceae
- Genus: Melanelixia
- Species: M. albertana

Binomial name
- Melanelixia albertana (Ahti) O.Blanco, A.Crespo, Divakar, Essl., D.Hawksw. & Lumbsch (2004)

Synonyms
- Parmelia albertana Ahti (1969); Melanelia albertana (Ahti) Essl. (1978)

= Melanelixia albertana =

Species of lichen

Melanelixia albertana is a species of corticolous (bark-dwelling), foliose lichen in the family Parmeliaceae. First described in 1969 from collections made in Alberta, Canada, it has undergone two taxonomic reclassifications before ultimately being placed in the genus Melanelixia in 2004. The species is characterised by the soralia on the margins of its lobes, a feature that is rare in brown parmelioid lichens. This feature is reflected in its common name, powder-rimmed camouflage lichen. Melanelixia albertana has an unusual Asian-North American disjunct distribution. The widespread presence of Melanelixia albertana across different regions is attributed to the similar climatic and vegetative conditions found in the northern parts of the interior prairies in North America, as well as in the forest steppe and ultracontinental taiga forests of northern Mongolia, Transbaikal, and Yakutia. It occurs in river valley and ravine systems, as well as aspen parkland.

== Taxonomy ==
It was first described as a new species in 1969 by the Finnish lichenologist Teuvo Ahti, who classified it in the genus Parmelia. The type specimen was collected by Ahti on the southwest tip of Alberta's Big Lake, where it was found in a poplar forest growing on Populus balsamifera. In 1978, Ted Esslinger reclassified the taxon, transferring it to the genus Melanelia as part of his reorganization of the brown parmelioid species. The taxon was finally transferred to genus Melanelixia in 2004, after molecular phylogenetics analysis showed that Melanelia was not monophyletic, instead falling into four different clades.

Melanelixia albertana was part of a 2016 phylogenetic analysis that investigated evolutionary relationships within the Melanohalea clade. This study, which included complete concatenated alignments of internal transcribed spacer and mitochondrial small subunit DNA sequences, revealed that Melanelixia albertana forms a monophyletic group within the genus Melanelixia, albeit with moderate bootstrap support (53%). The analysis also uncovered that the clade 'Melanelixia albertana' includes specimens identified as multiple nominal taxa from various regions, such as M. villosella from China, M. glabra from China and northern India, and two specimens from the Russian Far East.

The species-level clade named 'M. albertana' comprised specimens morphologically similar to M. albertana, including samples from the northern Great Plains of North America, China, Russia, and India. These findings indicate that Melanelixia albertana is a polymorphic species with a broad geographic distribution that includes high-elevation sites in Asia (China, India, and Russia) and lower elevation sites in North America. The study suggests that additional molecular sequence data are necessary to confirm species boundaries and propose formal taxonomic changes for the group.

The marginal soralia of Melanelixia albertana are a characteristic feature of this species, and otherwise rare in brown parmelioid lichens. This prominent character is reflected in its common name, the "powder-rimmed camouflage lichen".

== Description ==
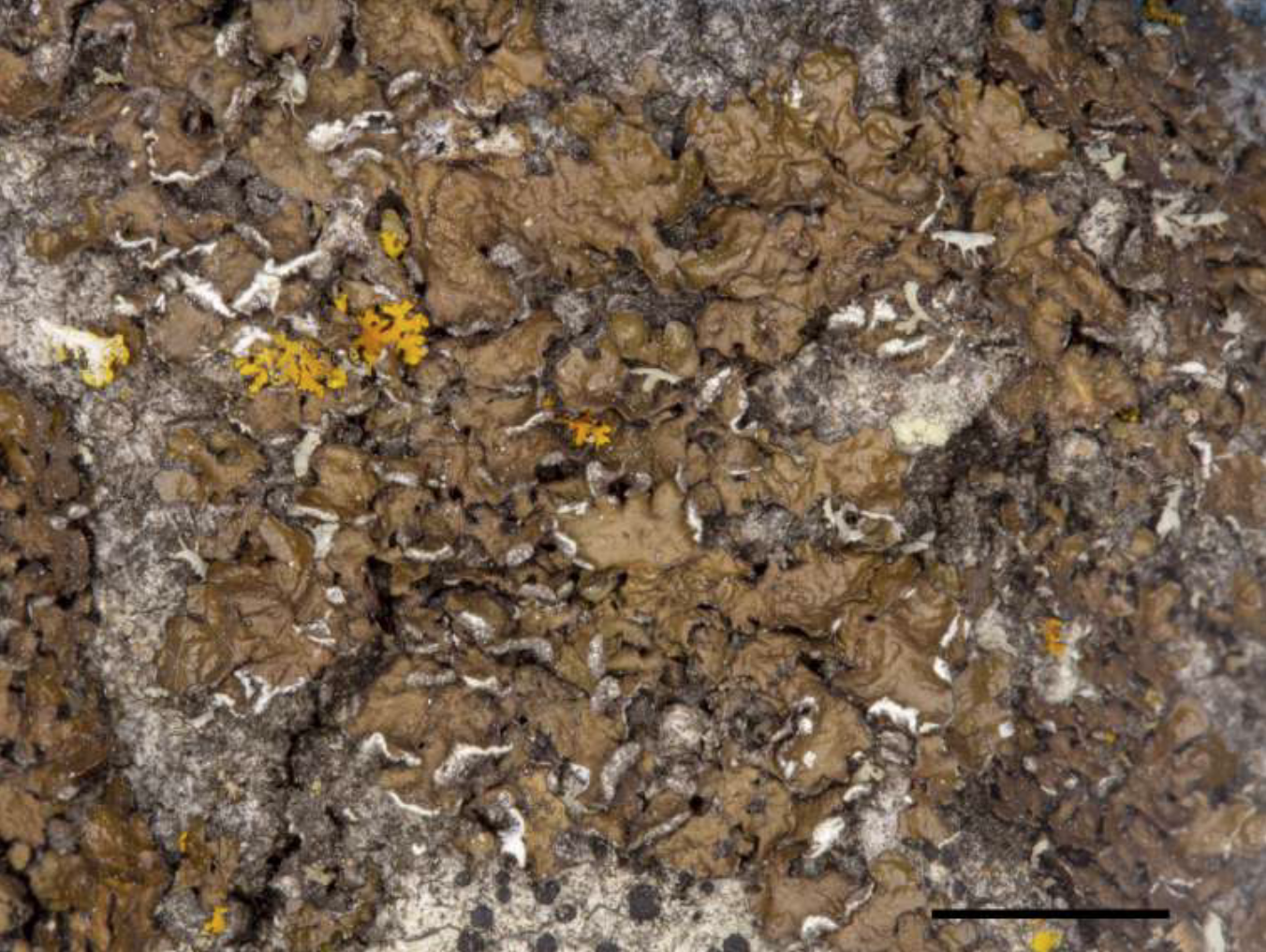
Melanelixia albertana from Altai Territory, Russia; scale bar = 5 mm

Melanelixia albertana loosely attaches to tree bark, forming a thallus (lichen body) that is 4–10 cm (1.6–3.9 in) wide. The colour of the thallus surface ranges from dark greenish-brown to red-brown. The lobes are rounded at the tips, 3–4 mm wide, and have irregular, crenulate (scalloped) edges with ascending sorediate lobes (lobes covered with powdery reproductive propagules). The upper surface is typically wrinkled, dull to somewhat shiny near the lobe ends, and lacks pseudocyphellae (tiny pores).

The lower surface is black with a smooth brown marginal rim, and features rhizines (root-like structures) that are the same colour. Soralia (clusters of soredia) are numerous, labriform (lip-shaped), and contain coarsely granular soredia that are partly white and partly dark brown. The lobes are 180–240 μm thick, with an upper cortex (outer layer) of 5–15 μm, an algal layer of 45–60 μm, a medulla (middle layer) of 120–150 μm, and a lower cortex of 10–15 μm.

Apothecia (fruiting bodies) and pycnidia (asexual reproductive structures) have not been observed to occur in this species. Chemical spot tests show that the medulla reacts C+ (red) and contains lecanoric acid.

== Habitat and distribution ==
Melanelixia albertana is an epiphyte that grows in river valley and ravine systems, as well as aspen parkland. It occasionally appears in boreal regions, particularly in mature mixed to deciduous forests. Favoured tree species in North America include deciduous trees and shrubs, particularly Salix and Populus. In Mongolia, it favours the native Siberian elm (Ulmus pumila) and the shrub Spiraea aquilegifolia.

The global distribution of Melanelixia albertana mirrors the climatic and vegetative similarities between the northern edge of the interior prairies of North America and the forest steppe and ultracontinental taiga forests found in northern Mongolia, Transbaikal, and Yakutia. The particular distribution type of this lichen has been called the "Interior Eurasian-interior North American" distribution, defined as "continental species of the arid inner parts of continents in vicinity to steppes or not".

In addition to its namesake Alberta, the lichen has also been recorded in the southern parts of the provinces of Saskatchewan and Manitoba. It is rare in Ontario, with a local distribution limited largely to the Rainy River district. In the United States, it has been found in Minnesota and Arizona. In extreme northwestern Ontario, Melanelixia albertana reaches its eastern distributional limit, where a warmer and drier climate prevails, shaped by the dry air masses from the prairies, distinguishing it from the cooler and more humid regions to the east in northern Ontario.

In Russia, M. albertana occurs in the Baikal area, the Altai Mountains, and the Caucasus. It was added to the Red Data Book of the Altai Territory in 2016. M. albertana was found in Mongolia's northeastern Khentii Province at about 1,100 m (3,600 ft) elevation. In the 2010s, its known range was further expanded when the lichen was recorded from Sichuan, China, at an elevation of 2,700 m (8,900 ft), and also from the Xinjiang Uyghur Autonomous Region.
