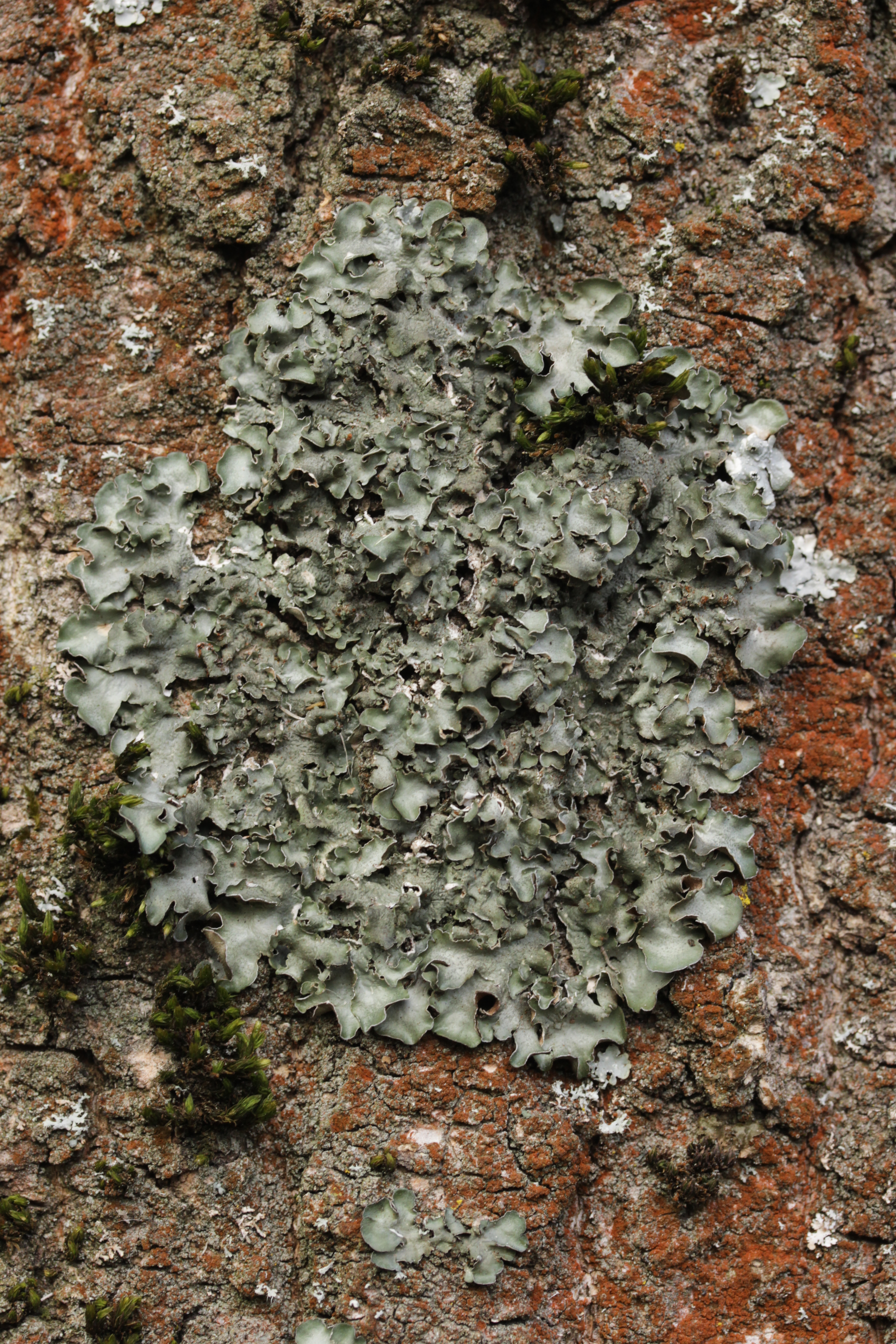

Scientific classification
- Domain: Eukaryota
- Kingdom: Fungi
- Division: Ascomycota
- Class: Lecanoromycetes
- Order: Lecanorales
- Family: Parmeliaceae
- Genus: Pleurosticta
- Species: P. acetabulum

Binomial name
- Pleurosticta acetabulum (Neck.) Elix & Lumbsch (1988)

Synonyms
- List: Lichen acetabulum Neck. (1768); Lichen corrugatus Sm. (1791); Lobaria acetabulum (Neck.) Hoffm. (1796); Parmelia corrugata (Sm.) Ach. (1803); Imbricaria acetabulum (Neck.) DC. (1805); Collema corrugatum Ach. (1810); Platysma acetabulum (Neck.) Frege (1812); Lichen furvus * corrugatum (Ach.) Lam. (1813); Parmelia acetabulum (Neck.) Duby (1830); Pleurosticta lichenicola Petr. (1931); Parmotrema acetabulum (Neck.) M.Choisy (1952); Melanelia acetabulum (Neck.) Essl. (1978)

= Pleurosticta acetabulum =

Species of lichen

Pleurosticta acetabulum is a species of foliose lichen in the family Parmeliaceae. It is common and widespread throughout Europe, where it grows on tree bark. It has also been recorded in Algeria.

== Taxonomy ==
Pleurosticta acetabulum is the type species of Pleurosticta – a genus circumscribed by mycologist Franz Petrak in 1931. Petrak's original type species was named Pleurosticta lichenicola, but this is now known as a synonym of P. acetabulum. It was originally described as Lichen acetabulum by Belgian physician and botanist Noël Martin Joseph Necker in 1768. It has been shuffled to several genera in its taxonomic history, acquiring many synonyms. For example, Georg Franz Hoffmann placed it the genus Lobaria in 1796, while Duby considered it a Parmelia in 1830. In more recent history, Maurice Choisy placed it in Parmotrema, while Ted Esslinger moved it to Melanelia. Most recently, John Elix and H. Thorsten Lumbsch transferred it to Pleurosticta when they resurrected that genus in 1988.

== Chemistry ==
The lichen contains several secondary chemicals, including atranorin, salazinic, norstictic, protocetraric, and evernic acids.

== Ecology ==
Lichenicolous fungi that have been recorded growing on Pleurosticta acetabulum include Abrothallus acetabuli, Lichenoconium erodens, and Stigmidium acetabuli.

== Research ==
Pleurosticta acetabulum has been used for research investigating its tolerance to extreme environmental conditions, such as those that might be found on planet Mars. It was shown that following exposure to complete dehydration, extremely low temperature (-196°C/77K), and oxygen depletion, the lichen was able to recover and its ability to produce a high yield of hydrogen was unchanged. This suggests that it might have use in astrobiological applications as a hydrogen producer in bioregenerative life support system for extraterrestrial environments.
