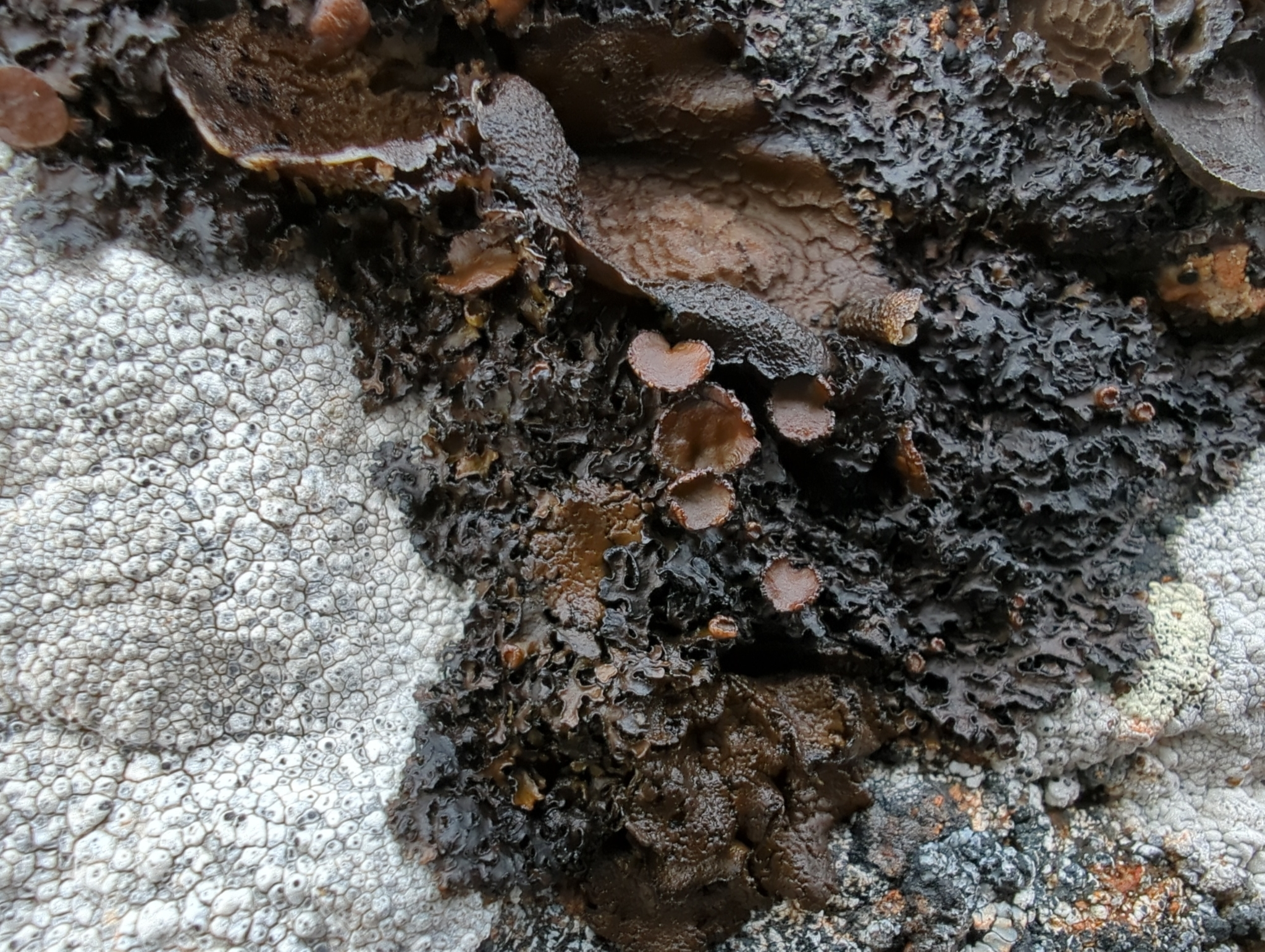

Conservation status
- Secure (NatureServe)

Scientific classification
- Kingdom: Fungi
- Division: Ascomycota
- Class: Lecanoromycetes
- Order: Lecanorales
- Family: Parmeliaceae
- Genus: Melanelia
- Species: M. hepatizon

Binomial name
- Melanelia hepatizon (Ach.) A.Thell (1995)

Synonyms
- List: Lichen hepatizon Ach. (1799); Parmelia fahlunensis var. hepatizon (Ach.) Ach. (1803); Platysma hepatizon (Ach.) Vain. (1888); Cetraria hepatizon (Ach.) Vain. (1899); Tuckermannopsis hepatizon (Ach.) Kurok. (1991); Platysma polyschizum Nyl. (1862); Cetraria fahlunensis var. polyschiza (Nyl.) Th.Fr. (1867); Imbricaria polyschiza (Nyl.) Arnold (1871); Parmelia fahlunensis var. polyschiza (Nyl.) Bagl. & Carestia (1880); Cetraria polyschiza (Nyl.) Jatta (1900); Cetraria hepatizon f. polyschizum (Nyl.) H.Magn. (1929); Cetraria hepatizon var. polyschiza (Nyl.) H.Magn. (1936)

= Melanelia hepatizon =

Species of lichen-forming fungus

Melanelia hepatizon, commonly known as the rimmed camouflage lichen or the rimmed brown-shield, is a species of saxicolous (rock-dwelling), foliose lichen in the family Parmeliaceae. Its thallus, ranging in colour from brown to black, features narrow, elongated lobes that can be flat, convex, or concave. This lichen has a circumpolar distribution, occurring in Asia, Europe, North America, Iceland, and Greenland.

== Taxonomy ==
The Swedish lichenologist Erik Acharius first scientifically described Melanelia hepatizon in 1799, initially classifying it in the eponymous genus Lichen, following the conventions established by Carl Linnaeus in Species Plantarum. Over time, the species was reclassified into several different genera before being placed in Melanelia by Arne Thell in 1995.

Chemical profiling and DNA barcoding have proven useful for distinguishing Melanelia species, including M. hepatizon. Molecular studies have nevertheless shown substantial intraspecific variation within M. hepatizon. One DNA barcoding study interpreted the high genetic distances among specimens as evidence that the taxon may include previously unrecognised lineages concealed by morphological similarity, while a later ITS study recovered 12 haplotypes, including new ones, but found no clear geographic structure and no correlation between haplotype variation and morphological, anatomical, or chemical characters. Molecular phylogenetic analysis shows that M. hepatizon has a sister relationship with M. stygia, the type species of the genus.

In North America, the species has been called the "rimmed camouflage lichen" or the "rimmed brown-shield".

== Description ==
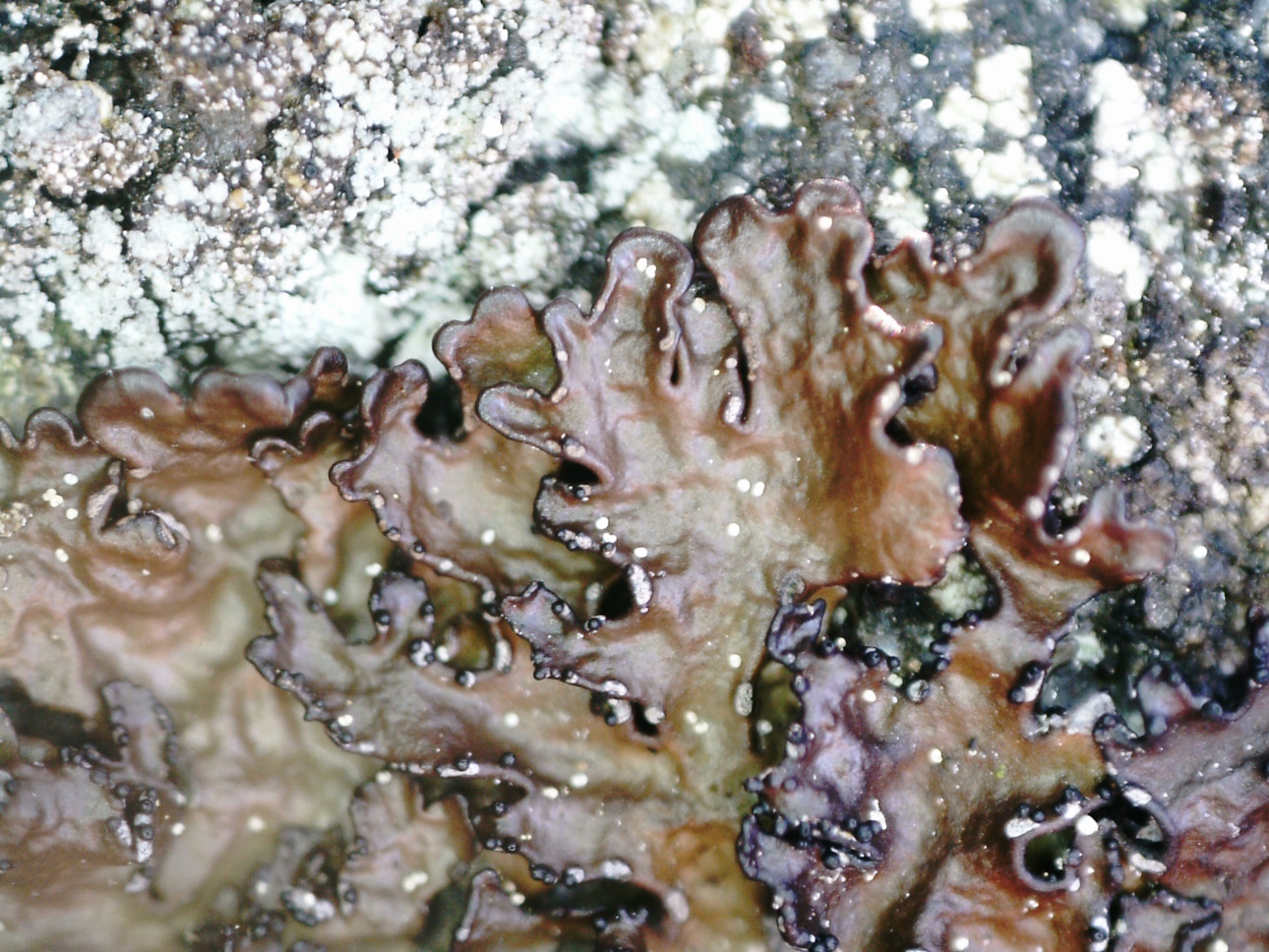
Closeup of lobes, showing thickened edges

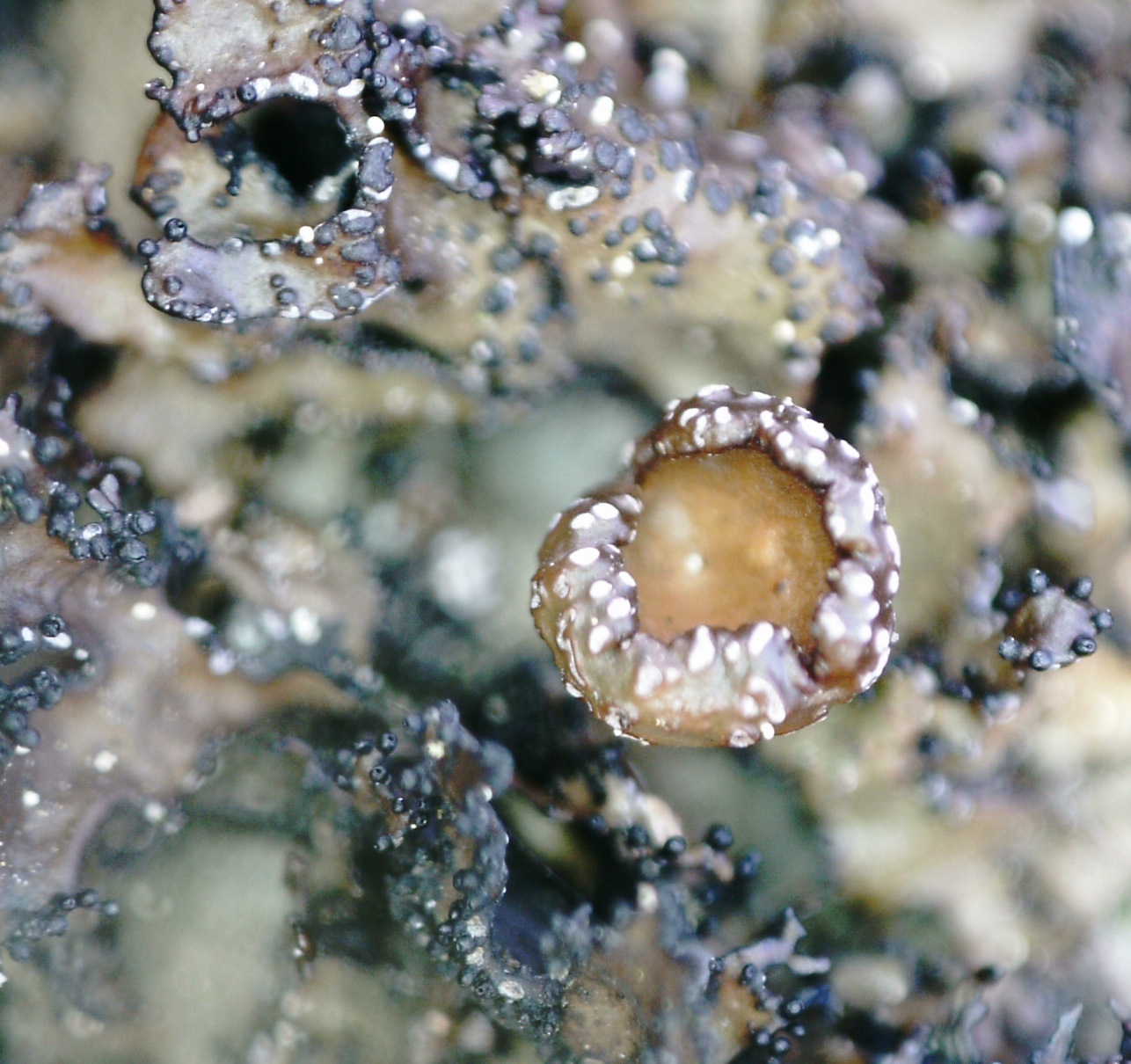
Apothecia are rimmed with white pseudocyphellae

Melanelia hepatizon has a dark brown, often shiny thallus. It is usually closely attached (appressed) to its substrate. The thallus measures up to 3 cm in diameter, and features narrow lobes, usually between 0.4 and 1.5 mm in width, occasionally reaching up to 2.5 mm. The edges of the lobes are distinctly thickened. This species lacks both soredia and isidia. A distinguishing characteristic of Melanelia hepatizon is the presence of conspicuous white pseudocyphellae (pores for gas exchange) along the lobe margins, especially around the margins of the apothecia (fruiting bodies).

The lower surface of Melanelia hepatizon is black at the centre, transitioning to dark brown towards the edges. Rhizines are sparse and primarily located at the margins. The pycnidia (asexual fruiting bodies) are black, cylindrical structures that are usually conspicuous on or near the lobe margins. Apothecia are common in this species. They are lecanorine in form, with a red-brown to brown disc that can reach up to 5 mm in diameter. The conidia are dumbbell-shaped and measure between 4 and 6 μm in length.

== Chemistry ==
The medulla of Melanelia hepatizon reacts positively to the PD spot test, turning orange, and to the K test, turning deep yellow. It does not react to the KC or C tests. The major secondary metabolites (lichen products identified in M. hepatizon include cryptostictic acid, stictic acid, and norstictic acid.

Melanelia hepatizon contains various additional secondary fungal metabolites, commonly known as mycotoxins. These mycotoxins were identified using enzyme-linked immunosorbent assay (ELISA), a method known for its high selectivity, sensitivity, and accuracy. The major mycotoxins detected in Melanelia hepatizon include sterigmatocystin, alternariol, emodin, mycophenolic acid, citrinin, diacetoxyscirpenol, cyclopiazonic acid, and zearalenone. These metabolites contribute to the diverse biochemical profile of Melanelia hepatizon and are characteristic of the broader group of fungi-associated lichen substances.

== Habitat and distribution ==
A circumpolar species, Melanelia hepatizon has a wide ecological amplitude, growing in diverse environments ranging from arctic sea-level stands to alpine belts in meridional zones, and from oceanic to continental sites. In the Himalayas, it has been recorded at elevations of 3,600 m (11,800 ft) and 4,500 m (14,800 ft). The lichen colonises siliceous rocks, occasionally wood and mosses, in various lowland and mountain tundra communities, as well as in open, exposed alpine vegetation. Its range includes China, Iceland, and Greenland. It is widespread in Europe, having been reported from 23 countries there, and is also widely distributed in the Russian Arctic. Its range in North America includes the Pacific Northwest and the Rocky Mountains extending north to Alaska and other arctic regions in the west, and the Appalachians and Great Lakes regions in the east.

Melanelia hepatizon is typically found in sun-exposed habitats in boreal, alpine, and Arctic zones. It is predicted to respond negatively to climate change due to its preference for cooler, stable environments. As temperatures rise and habitats shift, this species may face a decline in abundance and distribution.
