= Pleurosticta koflerae =

Scientific classification
- Domain: Eukaryota
- Kingdom: Fungi
- Division: Ascomycota
- Class: Lecanoromycetes
- Order: Lecanorales
- Family: Parmeliaceae
- Genus: Pleurosticta
- Species: P. koflerae

Binomial name
- Pleurosticta koflerae (Clauzade & Poelt) Elix & Lumbsch (1988)

Synonyms
- Parmelia koflerae Clauzade & Poelt (1961); Melanelia koflerae (Clauzade & Poelt) Essl. (1978)

Species of lichen

Pleurosticta koflerae is a species of foliose lichen in the family Parmeliaceae. It is a member of the group of species informally known as the "brown Parmeliae". The lichen was first formally described as Parmelia koflerae by lichenologists Georges Clauzade and Josef Poelt in 1961. Theodore Esslinger transferred it to the genus Melanelia in 1978 when he reorganized the classification of the brown Parmeliae, a continuation of his research on the group published the year before. It was finally transferred to the newly resurrected genus Pleurosticta in 1988 by H. Thorsten Lumbsch and John A. Elix.

Pleurosticta koflerae occurs in Eurasia. It has been reported from France, Russia, Slovakia, Armenia, and Kyrgyzstan.
