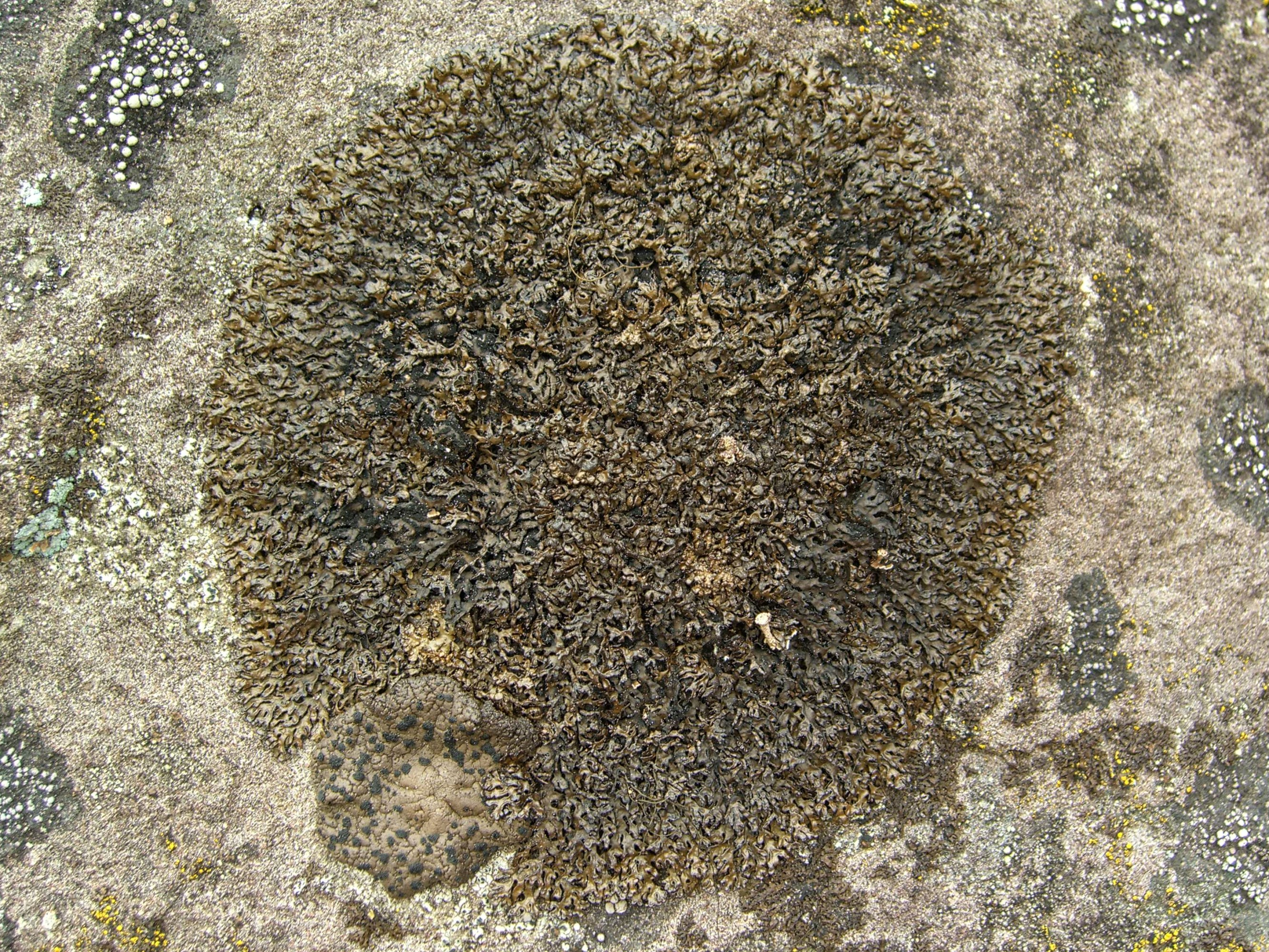

Conservation status
- Secure (NatureServe)

Scientific classification
- Kingdom: Fungi
- Division: Ascomycota
- Class: Lecanoromycetes
- Order: Lecanorales
- Family: Parmeliaceae
- Genus: Melanelia
- Species: M. stygia

Binomial name
- Melanelia stygia (L.) Essl. (1978)

Synonyms
- List: Lichen stygius L. (1753); Squamaria stygia (L.) Hoffm. (1794); Lobaria stygia (L.) Hoffm. (1796); Parmelia stygia (L.) Ach. (1803); Imbricaria stygia (L.) DC. (1805); Cetraria stygia (L.) Schaer. (1833); Parmelia fahlunensis var. stygia (L.) Schaer. (1840); Cornicularia stygia (L.) Nyl. (1854); Parmelia olivacea var. stygia (L.) Stirt. (1874); Parmelia stygia var. septentrionalis Lynge (1938)

= Melanelia stygia =

Species of lichen-forming fungus

Melanelia stygia, the alpine camouflage lichen, is a species of lichen in the family Parmeliaceae. The dark-coloured lichen, first described by Carl Linnaeus in 1753, forms leafy growths on rocks in arctic and alpine regions throughout the Northern Hemisphere. The lichen has a dark brown to black, glossy surface with narrow, overlapping lobes and tiny pores called pseudocyphellae scattered across its surface. It is a slow-growing species well-adapted to harsh mountain environments, where it is commonly found on non-calcareous rocks at high elevations. While it tolerates extreme cold conditions, climate change may pose a threat to its survival. The species can be used to produce a brownish-coloured wool dye.

== Taxonomy ==
It was first formally described in 1753 by the Swedish taxonomist Carl Linnaeus, who classified it in the eponymous genus Lichen. The type specimen was collected in Uppland, Sweden. It was transferred to several different genera in its long taxonomic history, including Squamaria, Lobaria, Parmelia, and Cetraria. Ted Esslinger reclassified it in Melanelia in 1978; it is the type species of this genus. Modern systematic revisions have narrowed Melanelia to four species (M. stygia, M. hepatizon, M. agnata, and M. pseudoglabra), with many former members transferred to other genera based on molecular evidence.

Later molecular phylogenetics analysis established it and its close relative Melanelia hepatizon as members of the "cetrarioid core". This is a phylogenetically defined group of lichens featuring an erect foliose to subfruticose thallus with reproductive structures, both sexual (apothecia) and asexual (pycnidia) located on the margins of lobes. Because species in this group can be hard to separate by appearance alone, molecular data are often used to support identifications. DNA barcoding of the nuclear ribosomal internal transcribed spacer (nrITS) region can identify M. stygia and its close relatives, but Icelandic material shows comparatively high nrITS variation, which Xu and colleagues interpreted as consistent with the possibility of previously unrecognized lineages within M. stygia; in their dataset it formed a strongly supported cluster in a distance-based analysis but was not recovered as a single clade in nrITS phylogenetic tree analyses. In the same Icelandic study, chemical profiling found M. stygia and M. agnata broadly similar in their major metabolites, reinforcing the usefulness of DNA data when specimens are ambiguous. A broader study of ITS variation, using Polish material together with sequences from elsewhere in the species' range, likewise found multiple haplotypes in M. stygia. Many of these were widely distributed, with some shared between temperate and polar populations, and the authors found no clear geographic pattern or consistent relationship between haplotype variation and morphological, anatomical, or chemical characters.

Some earlier studies suggested that while Melanelia stygia was closely aligned with the cetrarioid clade, it should not be considered a true member of this group.

Parmelia teretiuscula is a taxon that proposed by Alfred Oxner in 1940. Esslinger later considered it a synonym of Melanelia stygia.

In North America, Melanelia stygia is commonly known as the alpine camouflage lichen. It has several common names in Northern European languages, alluding its dark colouration and growth form. In Finnish, it is called sysiruskokarve, meaning "sooty brown lichen," while the Icelandic name bikdumba translates to "pitch-dark" or "tar-dark". The Norwegian name blankkrinslav refers to its glossy appearance and means "shiny ring lichen". In Swedish, it is known as svart sköldlav, which translates to "black shield lichen".

== Description ==
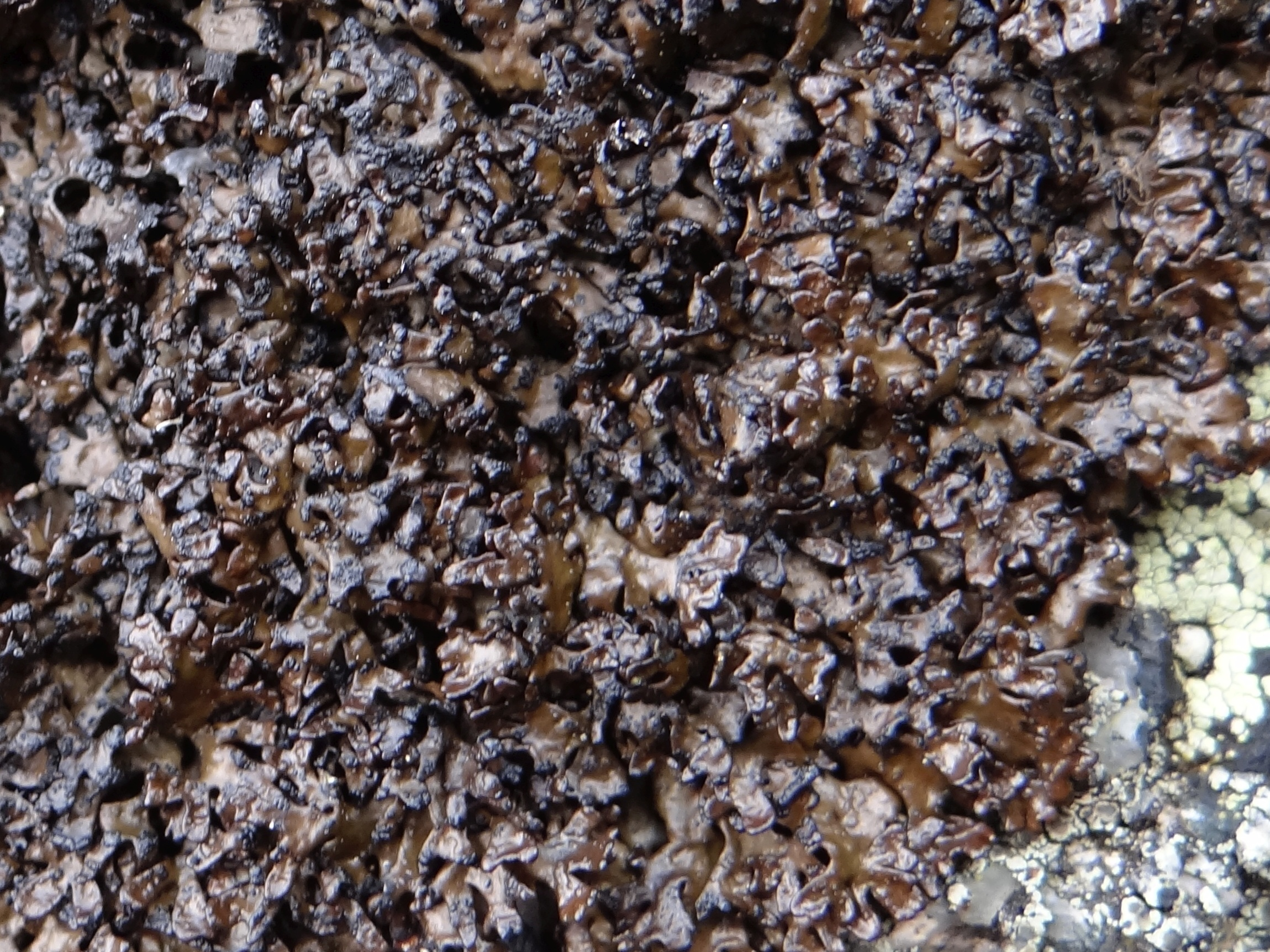
Close-up showing characteristic dark brown to black, glossy upper surface with overlapping lobes. The fleshy, irregular thallus structure and its somewhat loose attachment to the rock substrate are visible.

Melanelia stygia forms dark, leafy growths measuring 2–6 cm across, occasionally reaching 8 cm. The lichen body (thallus) attaches somewhat loosely to its substrate, with a fleshy texture. Its lobes are relatively narrow, measuring 0.5–2 mm in width, rarely reaching 3 mm. These lobes are thick and can be flat, convex, or almost cylindrical (terete) in cross-section. They extend outward in an irregular branching pattern. These lobes often overlap and intertwine with each other, creating a complex structure. The species can reach impressive sizes, with the largest documented thalli measuring up to 12 cm in diameter, though such large specimens are rare. Studies from Norwegian glacier forelands showed that average mature specimens typically reach around 62 mm in diameter.

The upper surface appears dark brown to nearly black and has a glossy sheen. Under magnification, one can observe tiny dark brown dots called pseudocyphellae scattered across the surface, each surrounded by a slightly raised rim. The lower surface shares a similar dark colouration and displays a wrinkled texture, anchored by thick, mostly unbranched root-like structures called rhizines.

The species regularly produces reproductive structures (apothecia), which can grow up to 5 mm in diameter. These disc-like structures start concave when young but flatten or become convex as they mature, maintaining a dark brown colour and glossy appearance. Their edges are notably warty and irregular, featuring the same tiny pores (pseudocyphellae) found on the main body. The lichen lacks both soredia and isidia, which are alternative reproductive structures common in other lichen species. Within the apothecia, which are constricted at their base, are microscopic spore-producing structures. The species also commonly produces pycnidia that are immersed in the lobes and release dumbbell-shaped conidia measuring 3.5–5.5 μm in length.

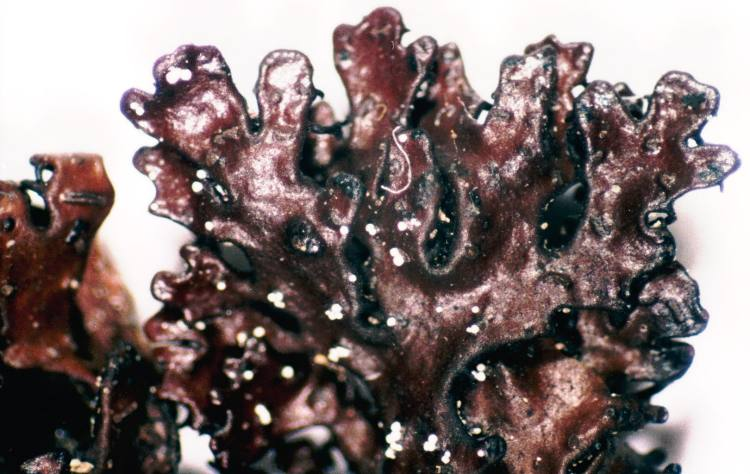
Closeup of a lobe of a herbarium specimen

When tested with chemical reagents commonly used in lichen identification, the outer layer shows a brown reaction to potassium hydroxide (K), while tests with calcium hypochlorite (C) and the KC combination show no reaction. The inner layer (medulla) typically shows an orange-red reaction when tested with para-phenylenediamine (Pd) due to the presence of fumarprotocetraric acid. However, some specimens show no reaction to any of these chemicals, containing either caperatic acid or no detectable substances at all. A chemical-profiling study of Icelandic herbarium material detected no major lichen products in M. stygia under its LC-MS conditions, and the authors noted geographic variation in reports, with depsidones such as fumarprotocetraric and protocetraric acids reported from Chinese collections but an absence of major lichen substancess reported for some European material.

Melanelia stygia is a slow-growing species, with documented annual diameter increases of only 0.5 mm per year under optimal conditions. Its growth pattern is characterised by relatively rapid early growth followed by a gradual decrease in growth rate. This growth rate is notably slower than most other parmelioid lichens, likely an adaptation to the harsh conditions of its alpine and arctic habitats where the growing season is limited by persistent snow cover and low temperatures.

== Similar species ==
Two species may be confused with Melanelia stygia. Melanelia hepatizon can be distinguished by several features: its reproductive structures (both apothecia and pycnidia) occur primarily along the margins rather than across the surface, and its pseudocyphellae are predominantly found at the edges. Additionally, when tested with potassium hydroxide (K), its inner layer turns yellow due to the presence of stictic and norstictic acids, unlike M. stygia.

Allantoparmelia alpicola is also superficially similar but lacks the glossy appearance characteristic of M. stygia, instead having a matt surface. It can be readily identified by the absence of both pseudocyphellae and rhizines. Its chemical profile is also distinct, with its medulla showing Pd+ (pale yellow) and C+ (pink), indicating the presence of alectorialic and barbatolic acids.

Two additional species might be confused with M. stygia, particularly when encountering specimens lacking the typical Pd+ (red) reaction. Pseudephebe minuscula shares the dark brown, glossy appearance and arctic-alpine habitat preference, but can be distinguished by its consistently narrower branches and the absence of true pseudocyphellae, though it does have pits from sunken pycnidia that can superficially resemble them. Melanelia commixta is also similar in appearance, but its pseudocyphellae are restricted to the lobe margins rather than scattered across the surface.

Collections of "Melanelia stygia" stored in the CSIR-National Botanical Research Institute Herbarium (located in Lucknow, India) were later determined to be Parmelia masonii (now Emodomelanelia masonii). Similarly, in a collection of specimens labelled "Melanelia stygia" in Lithuanian herbaria, it was found that these were actually Neofuscus (now Xanthoparmelia).

== Habitat and distribution ==
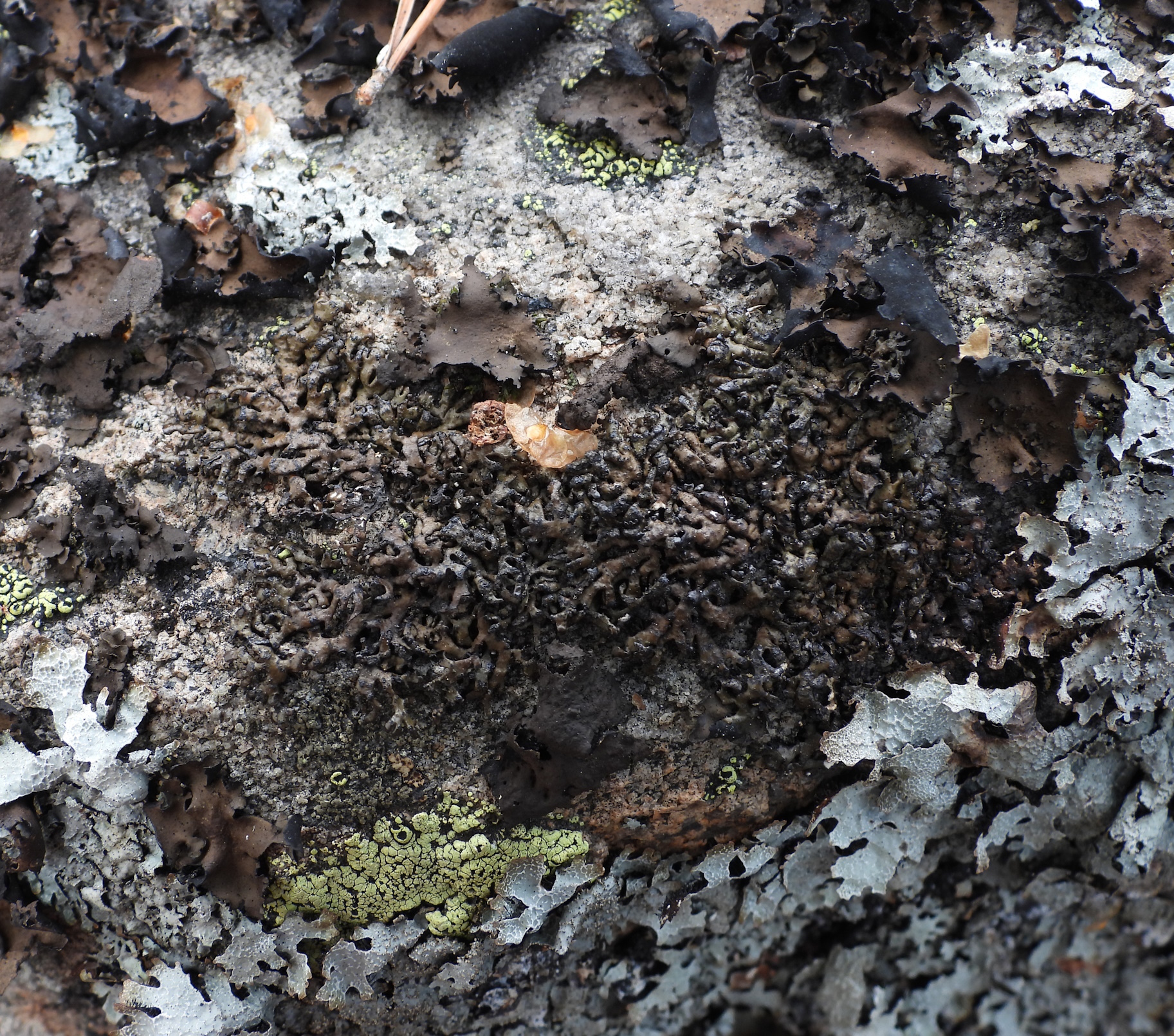
Melanelia stygia (centre) growing amongst a community of saxicolous lichens

Melanelia stygia has a circumpolar distribution, occurring throughout arctic and alpine regions in both continental and oceanic areas. The species shows a notable altitudinal range, having been recorded at elevations up to 3,000 metres in the Caucasus Mountains. It is widely distributed in Europe, having been recorded from 23 countries there. The species is most abundant in northern North America, particularly in Canada's coastal provinces and the Subarctic regions beyond.

This lichen is commonly found on non-calcareous (particularly siliceous) rocks and can be found in various environments, from arctic tundra to high mountain vegetation zones. In Central Europe, it is most commonly encountered in open areas of the upper mountain belt, particularly in communities characterised by the presence of rock tripe lichens (a community called Umbilicarion cylindricae). While it typically colonises rock surfaces, the species has also been documented growing on bare soil and decomposing plant material.

In the British Isles, as in other parts of its range, M. stygia shows a preference for exposed rocky habitats at higher elevations. Its ability to grow in both extremely cold arctic environments and high-altitude alpine regions suggests a tolerance for harsh climatic conditions. However, this adaptation to extreme environments may make it vulnerable to climate change. Like other species restricted to open habitats in boreal, alpine and Arctic zones, M. stygia is predicted to respond negatively to warming temperatures and associated vegetation changes, though its specific responses to these environmental shifts remain largely unknown. While the species demonstrates remarkable tolerance for harsh climatic conditions, its growth is significantly constrained by environmental factors. However, in its alpine habitats, it may benefit from increased moisture availability through frequent rain, mist and fog, which allows for extended periods of metabolic activity when conditions are suitable.

== Uses ==
Melanelia stygia can be used as a dye for wool. The colour of the dye is tan to brown.

== See also ==
- List of lichens named by Carl Linnaeus
