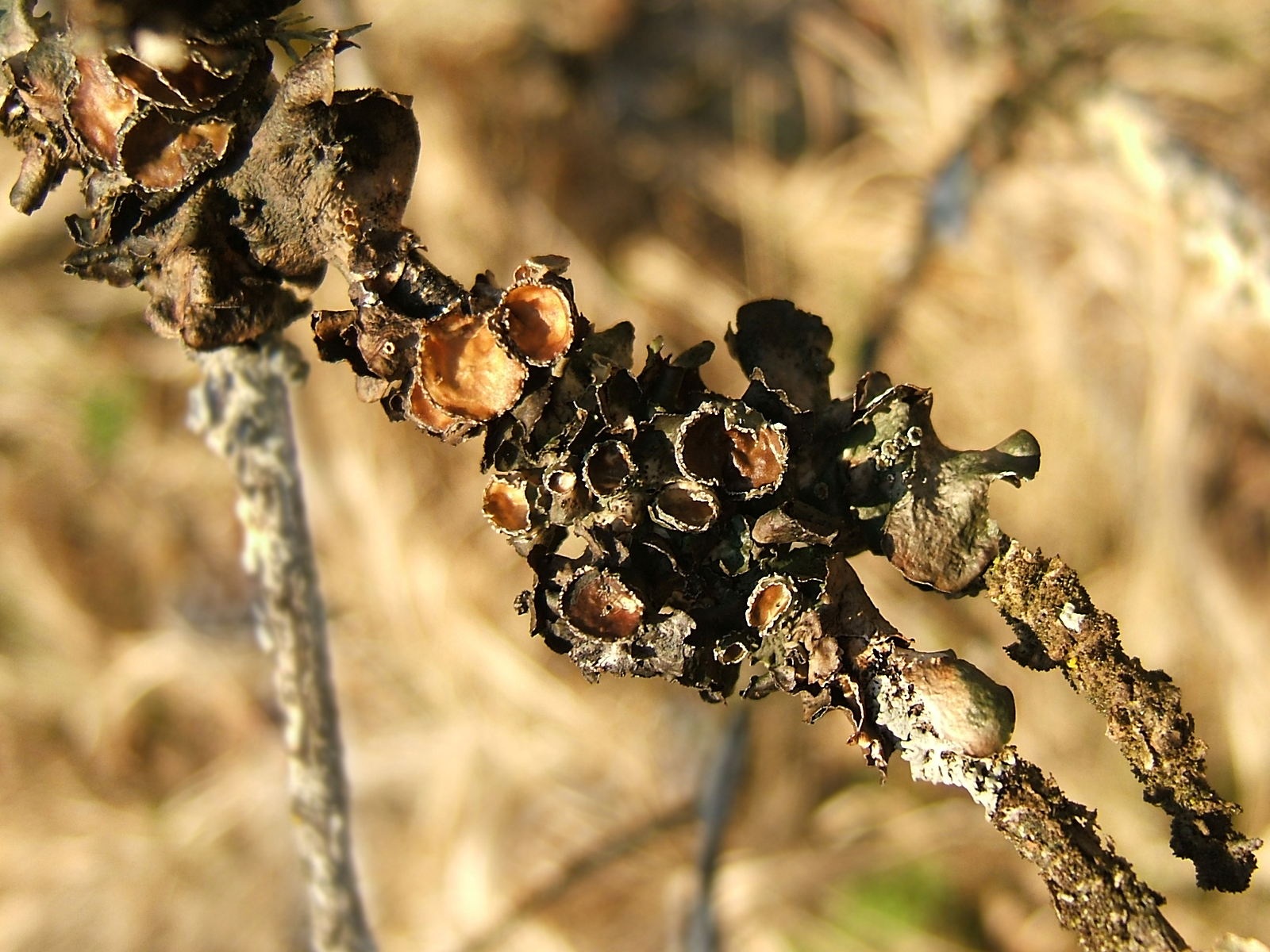
- Pleurosticta acetabulum

Scientific classification
- Kingdom: Fungi
- Division: Ascomycota
- Class: Lecanoromycetes
- Order: Lecanorales
- Family: Parmeliaceae
- Genus: Pleurosticta; Petr. (1931)

Type species
- Pleurosticta lichenicola Petr. (1931)

Species
- P. acetabulum P. koflerae

= Pleurosticta =

Genus of lichen

Pleurosticta is a small genus of foliose lichens belonging to the family Parmeliaceae. It has two species.

== Taxonomy ==
The genus was circumscribed by mycologist Franz Petrak in 1931, with Pleurosticta lichenicola assigned as the type species. This is now known as a synonym of P. acetabulum. The genus name fell into disuse when its species were transferred to Melanelia.

In 1980, Theodore Esslinger proposed conserving the name Melanelia for these species. However, H. Thorsten Lumbsch, Hans Kothe, and Jack Elix argued against this in 1988, choosing instead to resurrect Pleurosticta. Their decision was based on detailed morphological, chemical, and geographical studies which demonstrated that P. acetabulum and P. koflerae formed a distinct group warranting recognition at the generic level. The resurrection was supported by several distinctive characteristics that set these species apart from other members of the "brown Parmeliae", including the presence of a pored epicortex, bacilliform to fusiform conidia, a distinctive chemistry characterized by the presence of β-orcinol depsidones, and unique geographical distribution patterns.

== Description ==
Pleurosticta belongs to the parmelioid group of lichens, which are typically leaf-like (foliose) in appearance. The genus is characterized by several distinctive features. Its species have a pored epicortex, meaning the outer protective layer of the lichen has tiny holes in it. They produce spores through specialized structures called conidia, which in this genus are shaped like small rods (bacilliform) to spindle-shaped (fusiform), measuring between 12 and 16 μm by 6–11 μm.

The chemistry of Pleurosticta is distinctive among related genera, containing compounds called β-orcinol depsidones. These secondary metabolites are often used to distinguish between different groups of lichens. The genus lacks certain other compounds commonly found in related genera, such as fatty acids.

A key distinguishing feature of Pleurosticta is its temperate distribution pattern, setting it apart from related genera which are found in different climatic regions. For example, some similar-looking genera are primarily found in semi-arid regions or tropical rainforest canopies, while Pleurosticta species are typically found in temperate areas.

== Species ==
- Pleurosticta acetabulum (Neck.) Elix & Lumbsch (1988)
- Pleurosticta koflerae (Clauzade & Poelt) Elix & Lumbsch (1988)
