= Melanelia microglabra =

Scientific classification
- Kingdom: Fungi
- Division: Ascomycota
- Class: Lecanoromycetes
- Order: Lecanorales
- Family: Parmeliaceae
- Genus: Melanelia
- Species: M. microglabra

Binomial name
- Melanelia microglabra Divakar, Upreti, G.P.Sinha & Elix (2003)

Species of lichen

Melanelia microglabra is a rare species of saxicolous (rock-dwelling) foliose lichen in the family Parmeliaceae. It is found in high-elevation locations in Sikkim, India.

== Taxonomy ==
The lichen was formally described as a new species in 2003 by lichenologists Pradeep Divakar, Dalip Kumar Upreti, Gopal Prasad Sinha, and John Elix. The type specimen was collected by the third author in the Llonakh valley of Mangan district in Sikkim, at an altitude of 4,500 m (14,800 ft). It is named for its similarity to the bark-dwelling Australian species Melanelia pseudoglabra, from which it differs by its smaller thallus, narrower lobes, substrate preference, and chemistry.

== Description ==
The foliose thallus of Melanelia microglabra, which is somewhat loosely attached to its rock substrate, has a leathery texture and reaches a diameter of up to 1.5 cm (0.6 in). The individual lobes comprising the thallus measure 0.2–1.0 mm wide, with incised tips and lacking any cilia at the margins. The upper thallus surface is brown to black, with a rugulose to warty texture, and lacking isidia, soredia, pustules, pseudocyphellae, apothecia and pycnidia, while the lower thallus surface is black, with brown apices. The rhizines are sparse, simple, and black.

Melanelia microglabra contains gyrophoric acid and a major metabolite, ovoic acid as a submajor substance, and both lecanoric acid and 2-O-methyllecanoric acid and minor components. The expected results of standard chemical spot tests are K−, HNO_{3}+ (pale red) in the cortex, and K−, C+ (pink), KC+ (red), and P− in the medulla.

== Habitat and distribution ==
At the time of its original publication, Melanelia microglabra had only been collected at the type locality. It has since been enumerated as one of the approximately 200 lichen taxa recorded in the Kangchenjunga biosphere reserve in the eastern Himalayas.
