= Austromelanelixia =

Scientific classification
- Domain: Eukaryota
- Kingdom: Fungi
- Division: Ascomycota
- Class: Lecanoromycetes
- Order: Lecanorales
- Family: Parmeliaceae
- Genus: Austromelanelixia; Divakar, A.Crespo & Lumbsch 2017

Type species
- Austromelanelixia piliferella (Essl.) Divakar, Crespo & Lumbsch (2017)

Species
- A. calva A. fuscosorediata A. glabratuloides A. piliferella A. subglabra

Genus of fungi

Austromelanelixia is a genus of five species of foliose lichens in the family Parmeliaceae. All species are found in the Southern Hemisphere.

== Taxonomy ==
The genus was circumscribed in 2017 to accommodate a clade of Southern Hemisphere species formerly placed in genus Melanelixia. Although they were not included in the original circumscription of Melanelixia, they were later added by virtue of their sister-group relationship to other Melanelixia species. Austromelanelixia appears to have been accepted as a valid genus by later lichenologists and has been included in recent updates of fungal classification.

== Description ==
Austromelanelixia species have a foliose thallus with an upper surface that ranges in colour from olive-green to dark brown. There is often hyaline cortical hairs on lobe apices or isidial tip, and it is spotted or stained (maculate) particularly on the margins of the lobes. Pseudocyphellae are not present. The upper cortex is covered by a pored (fenestrate) epicortex. Ascospores are ellipsoid, colourless, simple, with dimensions of 10–18 by 7–10 μm. The conidia are bifusiform, hyaline, and measure 5–7 by l μm. The medulla contains gyrophoric acid.

== Habitat and distribution ==
All Austromelanelixia species are found in the Southern Hemisphere. They grow on bark (rarely on rock) in eastern and southeastern Australia, Tasmania, and New Zealand. Austromelanelixia subglabra is also found in southern South America.

== Species ==
- Austromelanelixia calva (Essl.) Divakar, A.Crespo & Lumbsch (2017)
- Austromelanelixia fuscosorediata (Essl.) Divakar, A.Crespo & Lumbsch (2017)
- Austromelanelixia glabratuloides (Essl.) Divakar, A.Crespo & Lumbsch (2017)
- Austromelanelixia piliferella (Essl.) Divakar, A.Crespo & Lumbsch (2017)
- Austromelanelixia subglabra (Räsänen) Divakar, A.Crespo & Lumbsch (2017)
