= Stagonospora exasperatulae =

Scientific classification
- Kingdom: Fungi
- Division: Ascomycota
- Class: Dothideomycetes
- Order: Pleosporales
- Family: Phaeosphaeriaceae
- Genus: Stagonospora
- Species: S. exasperatulae

Binomial name
- Stagonospora exasperatulae Brackel (2009)
- Holotype: Thalkirchen, Germany

Species of lichen

Stagonospora exasperatulae is a species of lichenicolous (lichen-dwelling) fungus in the family Phaeosphaeriaceae. It was described as a new species by Wolfgang von Brackel in 2009. It has a limited distribution, reported only from Austria, Germany, and Ukraine. It also has a narrow host range, as it only grows on the foliose lichen Melanohalea exasperatula.

== Taxonomy ==
Stagonospora exasperatulae was first formally named and described by Wolfgang von Brackel in 2009. The species was classified within the genus Stagonospora based on its conidial morphology and reproductive characteristics. Unlike many members of Stagonospora, which are plant pathogens or parasites primarily on grasses, S. exasperatulae demonstrates a mycoparasitic lifestyle, exclusively infecting the lichen Melanohalea exasperatula. Its holoblastic, monoblastic conidiogenesis (a method of spore production) and the absence of conidiophores further support its placement in Stagonospora. The species is distinct from other fungal parasites on vascular plants, such as Stagonospora subseriata, due to its unique host association and morphological features.

== Description ==
The fungus forms singular, immersed to semi-immersed fruiting bodies known as conidiomata, which are black, subglobose (nearly spherical), and measure 180–250 μm in diameter. These structures are ostiolate, meaning they have small openings through which spores are released. The conidiomata walls consist of pseudoparenchymatous (brick-like) cells, 6–11 μm long and 6–8 μm wide, arranged in two to three layers at the base and a single layer at the apex.

Conidiophores, which typically bear spore-producing cells, are absent in this species. Instead, the conidiogenous cells, where spores are produced, are directly attached to the inner walls of the conidiomata. These cells are subglobose to ampulliform (flask-shaped), smooth, hyaline (colourless), and measure 8–14 μm in length and 6–10 μm in width. The conidia, or asexual spores, are abundant and broadly spindle-shaped, with straight to slightly curved forms. They are hyaline when young but may turn pale brown at maturity. The conidia are transversely septate, containing 1 to 6 compartments, and often feature a thin gelatinous sheath. Mature conidia measure 34.1–42.7 μm in length and 6.5–7.4 μm in width.

== Habitat and distribution ==
Stagonospora exasperatulae has been found exclusively on the thallus of the lichen Melanohalea exasperatula. The infected portions of the host lichen show noticeable bleaching, transitioning from their typical glossy dark green coloration to a dull light brown. Nearby lichens in direct contact with the infected thallus, such as Melanelia subaurifera, Parmelia sulcata, and Punctelia subrudecta, show no signs of infection, suggesting host specificity.

The species has a restricted geographical range. In Bavaria, Germany, it has been recorded at three sites: a campground in Thalkirchen, Munich; a nearby area south of Hinterbrühl; and a pasture near Gut Hartschimmel at lake Ammersee. These sites are characterised by elevations ranging from 525 to 720 metres. In 2018, it was recorded from Tirol, Austria, and in 2020, from Ternopil Oblast in Ukraine.
