= Melanelixia ahtii =

Scientific classification
- Kingdom: Fungi
- Division: Ascomycota
- Class: Lecanoromycetes
- Order: Lecanorales
- Family: Parmeliaceae
- Genus: Melanelixia
- Species: M. ahtii

Binomial name
- Melanelixia ahtii S.D.Leav., Essl., Divakar, A.Crespo & Lumbsch (2016)

Species of lichen

Melanelixia ahtii is a species of foliose lichen in the family Parmeliaceae. Found in the United States, it was formally described as a new species in 2016 by Theodore Lee Esslinger, Ana Crespo, Helge Thorsten Lumbsch, Pradeep Kumar Divakar, and Steven Leavitt. The type specimen was collected from the north side of the Columbia River Gorge (Klickitat County, Washington). Here, at an elevation of 75 m (246 ft) above sea level, it was found in a mixed oak-ponderosa pine forest, growing as an epiphyte on an oak. The species is known from DNA-verified collections in four western US states: California, Idaho, Oregon, and Washington. The species epithet ahtii honours Finnish lichenologist Teuvo Ahti, "for his contributions to understanding diversity in brown parmelioid lichens".
