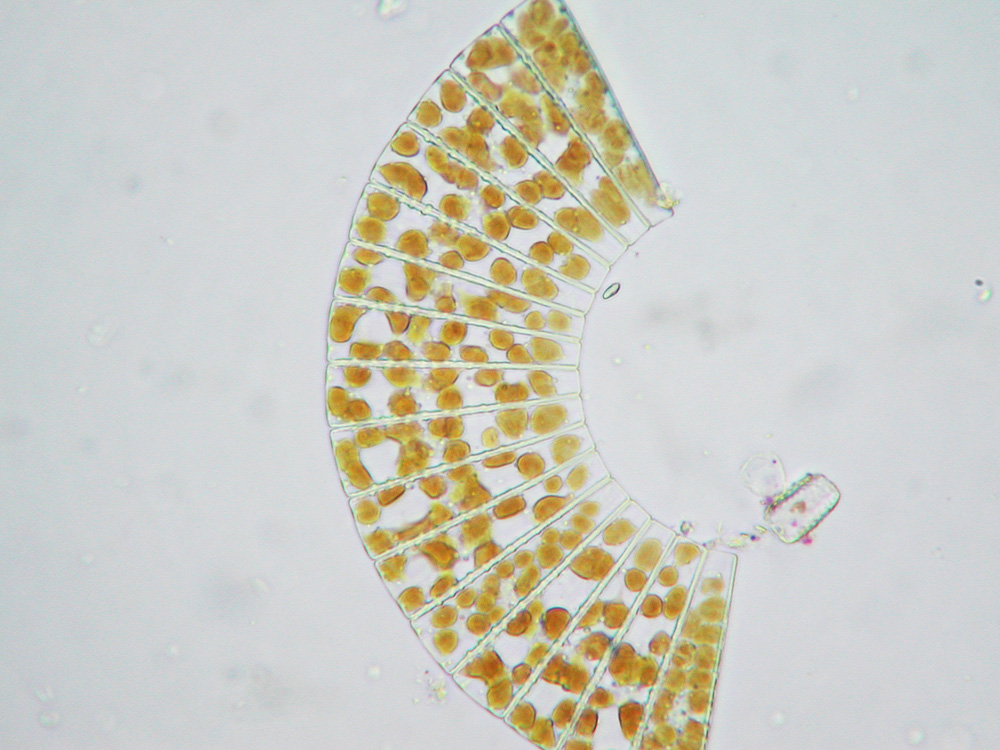
- Meridion circulare

Scientific classification
- Domain: Eukaryota
- Clade: Sar
- Clade: Stramenopiles
- Division: Ochrophyta
- Clade: Bacillariophyta
- Class: Fragilariophyceae
- Order: Tabellariales
- Family: Tabellariaceae
- Genus: Meridion; C.A.Agardh, 1824

= Meridion =

Genus of diatoms

Meridion is a genus of diatoms belonging to the family Fragilariaceae.

The genus has cosmopolitan distribution.

Species:

- Meridion alansmithii L.A.Brant, 2003
- Meridion circulare (Greville) C.Agardh, 1831
- Meridion coccocampyla Ehrenberg, 1854
