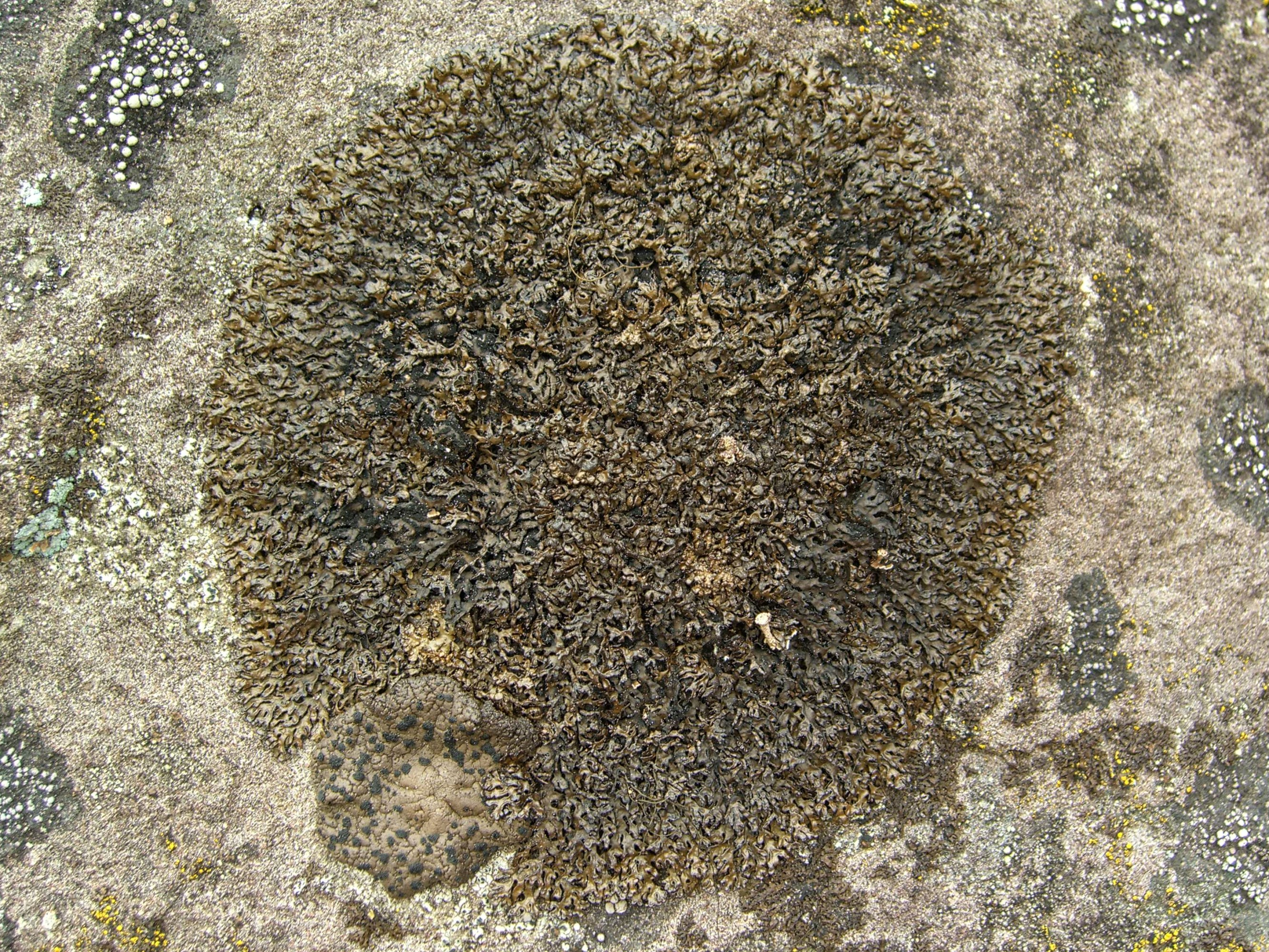
- Melanelia stygia

Scientific classification
- Kingdom: Fungi
- Division: Ascomycota
- Class: Lecanoromycetes
- Order: Lecanorales
- Family: Parmeliaceae
- Genus: Melanelia; Essl. (1978)

Type species
- Melanelia stygia (L.) Essl. (1978)

Species
- M. commixta M. hepatizon M. microglabra M. pseudoglabra M. stygia

Synonyms
- Parmelia subg. Melanoparmelia (Hue) Essl. (1977)

= Melanelia =

Genus of lichen-forming fungi

Melanelia is a genus of lichen-forming fungi in the family Parmeliaceae. These lichens typically grow on rocks and form relatively large, leaf-like structures with brown to blackish upper surfaces and pale undersides. The genus originally included many more species, but most have since been moved to related genera like Melanohalea and Melanelixia, leaving only five accepted species today.

== Taxonomy ==
The genus was circumscribed by Ted Esslinger in 1978, with Melanelia stygia assigned as the type species. He divided the genus into three subgenera: Melanelia (6 spp.), Olivascentes (2 spp.), and Vainioëllae (29 spp.). Most of these species have since been transferred to segregate genera, including Melanohalea and Melanelixia.

== Description ==
Melanelia forms comparatively large, leaf-like thalli (the lichen "body") that lie either loosely or quite snugly against their substrate. Each thallus is dorsiventral—meaning the upper and lower sides differ in colour and structure—and is divided into short rounded or elongate lobes whose edges lack the hair-like cilia seen in some related genera. The upper surface ranges from mid-brown or olive-brown to almost black; it can be thin and papery or rather fleshy, and is typically unspotted. In some species the surface is broken by tiny pale pores (pseudocyphellae) or dust-like outgrowths (soredia) that serve as vegetative propagules. The cortex above consists of tightly packed, roughly spherical cells covered by a thin, non-porous skin (epicortex). Beneath lies a loose white medulla, while the lower surface is pale tan through to black and bears simple root-like rhizines that anchor the thallus; these rhizines are usually unbranched but may occasionally fork or end in a small brush.

Sexual reproduction takes place in plate-like apothecia (fruiting bodies) that sit on the upper surface. Most are stalkless, though a few species develop very short stalks. The discs start concave and often flatten with age; they remain solid (imperforate) and vary from reddish brown to very dark brown-black. Inside each ascus eight smooth, colourless, ellipsoidal spores mature. Asexual propagules arise in flask-shaped pycnidia that are partly immersed in the lobe surface or stand out along the margins. These structures release slender conidia that are spindle-shaped, very slightly two-ended, or rod-like, providing an alternative means of dispersal.

The rich brown palette of Melanelia is caused by one or more unidentified pigments in the cortical layer. Secondary metabolites are otherwise absent in many species, but some produce small quantities of orcinol para-depsides, β-orcinol depsidones, or simple aliphatic acids.

== Habitat, distribution, and ecology ==
Melanelia species are typically saxicolous (rock-dwelling), and in rare instances they have been found growing on bark (corticolous).

== Species ==
As of June 2025, Species Fungorum (in the Catalogue of Life) accepts five species of Melanelia:

- Melanelia commixta (Nyl.) A.Thell (1995)
- Melanelia hepatizon (Ach.) A.Thell (1995)
- Melanelia microglabra Divakar, Upreti, G.P.Sinha & Elix (2003) – India
- Melanelia pseudoglabra (Essl.) Essl. (1978)
- Melanelia stygia (L.) Essl. (1978)
