= Lichen biogeography =

Study of the distribution of lichens

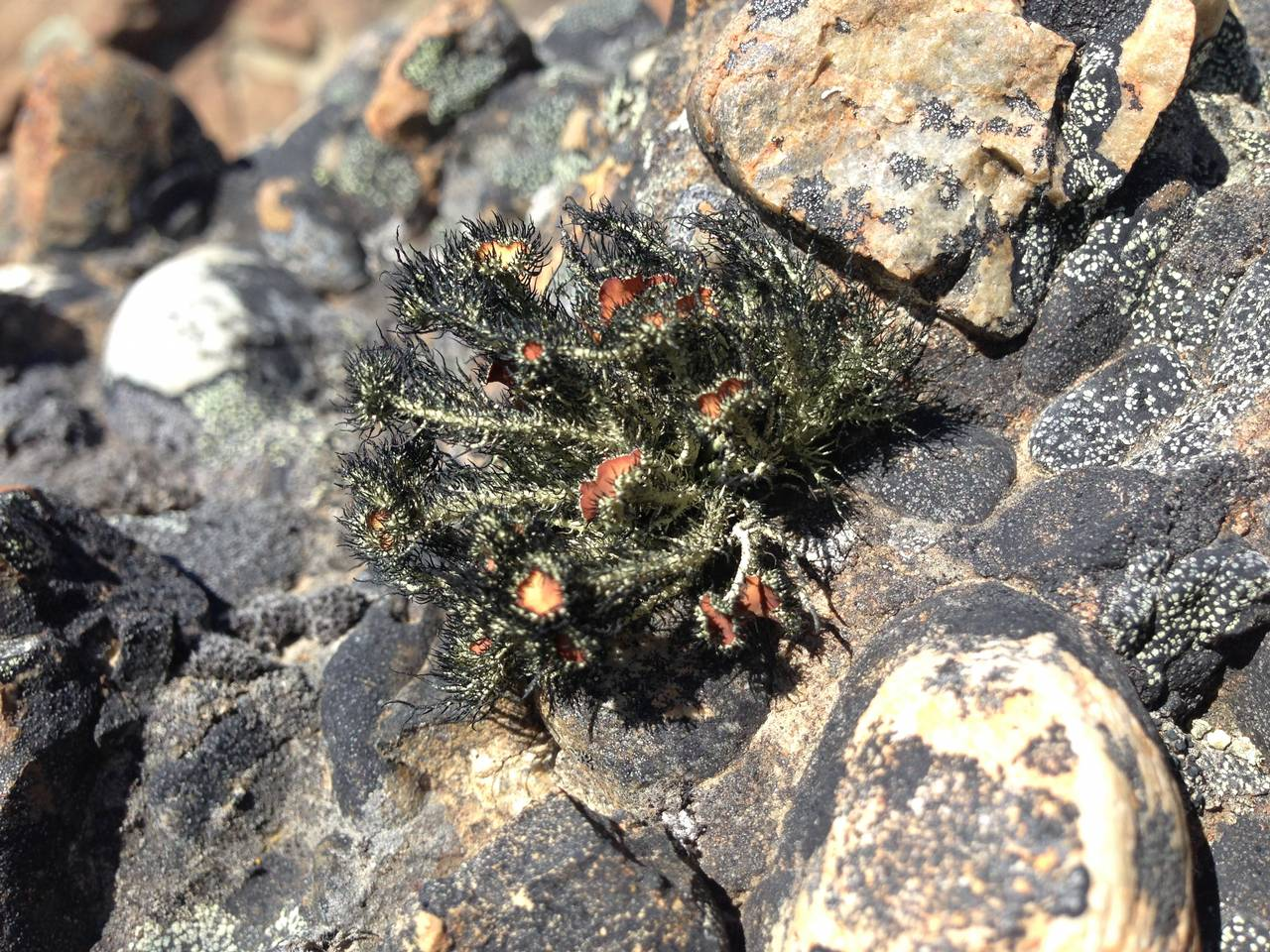
Usnea sphacelata is a fruticose lichen with a bipolar distribution pattern, occurring at high latitudes in both hemispheres.

Lichen biogeography is the branch of biogeography that studies where lichens occur and how their distributions have changed through time. Lichens are symbiotic organisms: they consist of a fungus living together with a photosynthetic partner, usually a green alga or cyanobacterium. Which photosynthetic partner (the photobiont) a fungus can use, how selective that partnership is, and whether suitable partners are available locally can affect where lichens establish and persist. Research spans scales from microhabitats to comparisons among regions and continents, and from recent range shifts to patterns shaped by deep-time events in Earth history.

A central question is whether wide ranges in lichen-forming fungi mainly reflect long-distance dispersal, or whether they reflect the splitting of populations by new barriers or shifting landmasses (vicariance) and other Earth-history processes. Reported patterns range from narrowly endemic species to taxa that are widespread but still have clear geographic limits, to strongly disjunct distributions such as bipolar ranges at high latitudes in both hemispheres. DNA-based studies show that some species that look uniform by morphology actually contain multiple genetically distinct lineages, each with a different geographic range. Regional species lists are also compared to see which areas share similar sets of lichen-forming fungi. One recurring result is a broad split between Gondwanan and Laurasian elements (a southern-versus-northern pattern at the scale of continents). Across taxa, common themes include local endemism, species that are widespread but regionally bounded, and repeated long-distance disjunctions (especially bipolar and intercontinental patterns); true cosmopolitanism appears uncommon.

Traditionally, lichen biogeography compared regions using morphology-based checklists, but modern work increasingly uses DNA sequencing and phylogeography (the study of how genetic lineages are distributed across geography). Species distribution modelling, which relates occurrence records to climate and habitat variables, is increasingly used to map potential ranges and forecast responses to environmental change. Molecular studies have revealed that many lichens previously thought to be widespread single species are actually complexes of distinct, genetically isolated lineages with narrower ranges. This shift matters for conservation planning, because cryptic diversity (genetically distinct lineages that are hard to tell apart by appearance) can be overlooked. Biogeographic data help assess how lichen communities respond to air pollution, habitat fragmentation, and global climate change.

== Definition and scope ==
Lichens are symbioses in which a fungus (the mycobiont) partners with a photosynthetic organism (the photobiont), usually a green alga and/or a cyanobacterium. A single lichen-forming fungus can associate with more than one photobiont type, and some lichens contain both a green alga and a cyanobacterium (tripartite lichens). Beyond the mycobiont and photobiont, the lichen body (thallus) often contains additional fungi (including endolichenic and lichenicolous forms) and commonly harbours bacteria. Lichenization (forming lichens) is common among fungi. One 2017 estimate put lichen-forming fungi at about 27% of known fungi (more than 19,409 species). Work in the 2010s moved beyond the simple "one fungus and one photobiont" picture of lichen symbiosis. Instead, some authors describe the thallus as a dynamic metacommunity: a linked, interacting community of multiple organisms living together. This broader view has been linked to the discovery of specialist basidiomycete yeasts living in the cortex (outer layer) of some lichens whose main fungus is an ascomycete. However, cystobasidiomycete yeasts appear rare rather than ubiquitous: a broad DNA-based metagenomic survey of 413 thalli detected them in only nine species (2.7%).

Biogeographic research describes where organisms and lineages occur, and it examines the processes that shape those patterns. Lichen biogeography examines distribution patterns across multiple spatial and temporal scales, considering both historical events and contemporary ecological factors. DNA-based family-tree studies (molecular phylogenetics) can reveal genetically distinct lineages that are hard to distinguish by appearance within widely recognized morphospecies (species defined mainly by morphology). As a result, morphospecies-based range maps can obscure lineages with more restricted distributions.

=== Background and deep-time context ===
Biogeography examines where organisms occur now and where they occurred in the past, then seeks explanations by testing ideas against new observations at different scales. The fossil record for lichen-forming fungi is sparse. Lichen fossils have been recovered from the Early Devonian Rhynie chert of Scotland (about 400 million years old). Older Ediacaran material from marine phosphorites of the Doushantuo Formation at Weng'an (c. 635–551 million years ago) has also been described as lichen-like associations. Later reviews treat that Precambrian (Ediacaran) interpretation as uncertain.

== Perspectives and major ideas ==
Biogeographers often organize work around two complementary kinds of explanation: historical processes (such as tectonics, vicariance, and dispersal) and ecological constraints that limit present-day ranges. The two perspectives are complementary rather than competing, but they remain useful for organizing work. Ecological and historical approaches often overlap, and ecological biogeography can still include reconstructions of past demography, interactions, and environmental constraints.

A recurring question is whether wide ranges mainly reflect frequent long-distance dispersal (sometimes summarized as "everything is everywhere") or vicariance and other Earth-history processes. Evidence supports both explanations, and the balance differs among taxa: similar present-day ranges can arise through different histories. For example, a historical biogeographic analysis of Chroodiscus linked its present-day distribution to vicariance and dispersal between nearby or connected continental shelves, rather than to recent trans-oceanic long-distance dispersal. Analyses in lichen biogeography draw on several traditions. Some emphasize dispersal, some emphasize vicariance using cladistic relationships and area histories, some use panbiogeographic "tracks" (repeated map patterns), and some use phylogeography to infer past population movements from genetic data.

== Patterns of distribution in lichens ==
Lichen ranges span from local endemics to taxa recorded across multiple continents, with recurring patterns at both small and large spatial scales. Many lichen-forming fungi occur across multiple climatic zones or continents, a breadth of distribution that is uncommon in vascular plants. Wide ranges that track climate and habitat are common among lichen-forming fungi, whereas truly cosmopolitan taxa are few.

=== Latitudinal gradients ===
Studies of latitudinal diversity patterns in lichens use both specimen-backed occurrence data (vouchered records) and sequencing-based surveys. In specimen-backed datasets, heavily collected areas can appear artificially species-rich. In sequencing surveys, the DNA often comes from propagules (spores or tiny fragments) rather than from established lichens. In the western United States, richness does not simply increase or decrease with latitude when models (MaxEnt) account for uneven collecting. A DNA metabarcoding survey of lichen-forming fungal propagules from settled dust across the contiguous United States found a significant but weak reverse latitudinal gradient: propagule richness was higher at higher latitudes. In Spain, epiphytic communities on European beech (Fagus sylvatica) showed higher lichen richness towards the north across the study gradient. Species turnover along the gradient was linked to higher dry-season rainfall at higher latitudes.

=== Widespread and cosmopolitan patterns ===
Even the widest-ranging lichens are rarely found everywhere: many have clear geographic limits and track broad climatic gradients. Some lichen-forming fungi have circumpolar ranges in the Northern Hemisphere, including arctic–alpine variants. Examples of these distribution types include Cladonia coniocraea (circumpolar) and Montanelia tominii (circumpolar arctic–alpine). Some lichens described as cosmopolitan are recorded from all major landmasses and from many oceanic islands. Within the Hypogymnioid clade (Arctoparmelia, Brodoa, Hypogymnia and Pseudevernia in family Parmeliaceae), only a few species appear truly cosmopolitan. These are the taxa that reproduce using vegetative propagules that disperse both symbiotic partners together. Phylogenetic evidence in Parmeliaceae suggests that truly cosmopolitan species are rarer than earlier assumed.

One analysis compared foliicolous (leaf-dwelling) lichens using presence/absence across six lichenogeographical regions, and it defined 22 distribution patterns within that framework. In that analysis, many foliicolous lichen species were widely distributed, including cosmopolitan or pantropical species (21%) and species disjunct on at least two continents (19%).

Examples of widespread lichens

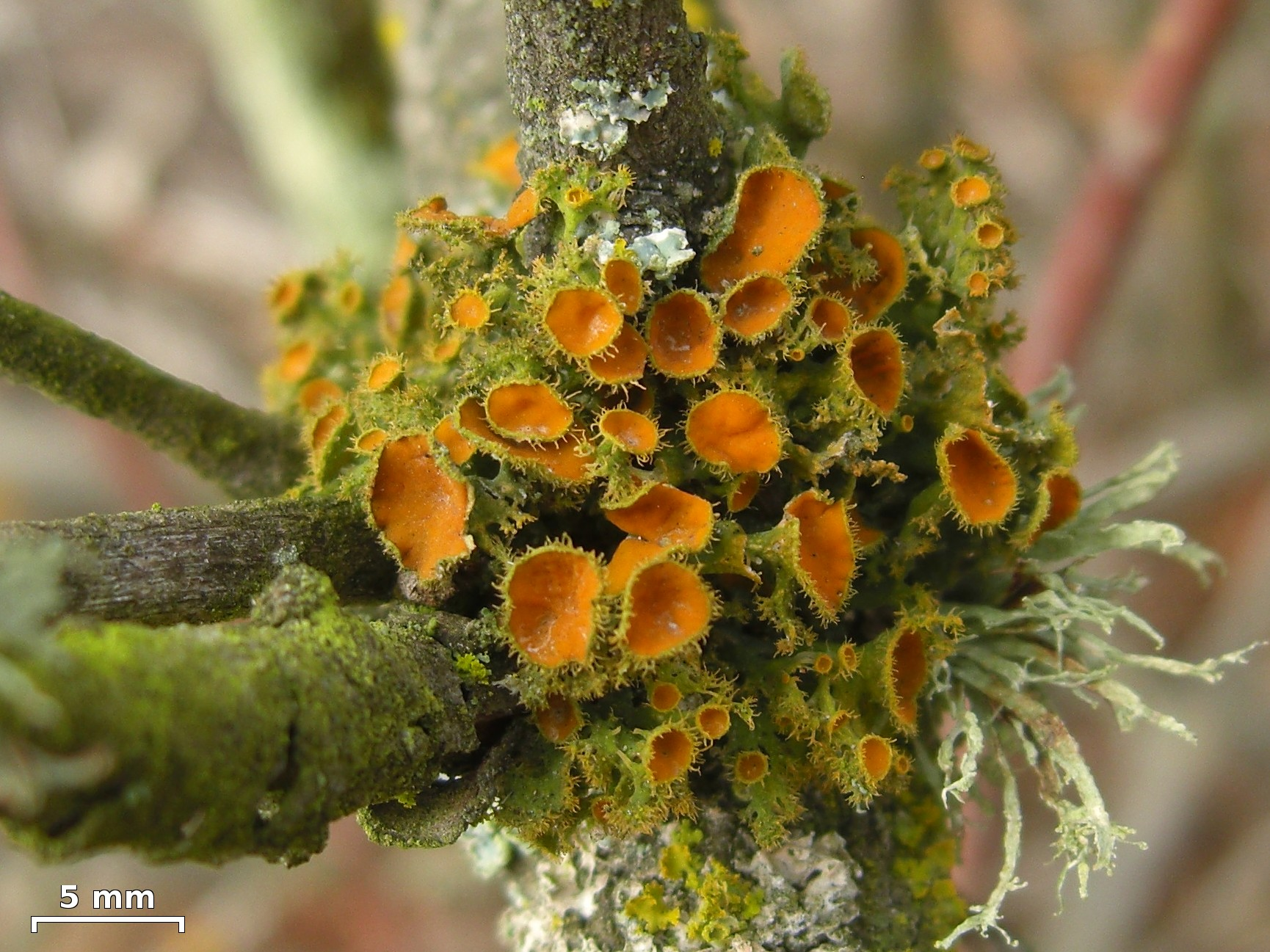
Teloschistes chrysophthalmus (fruticose)

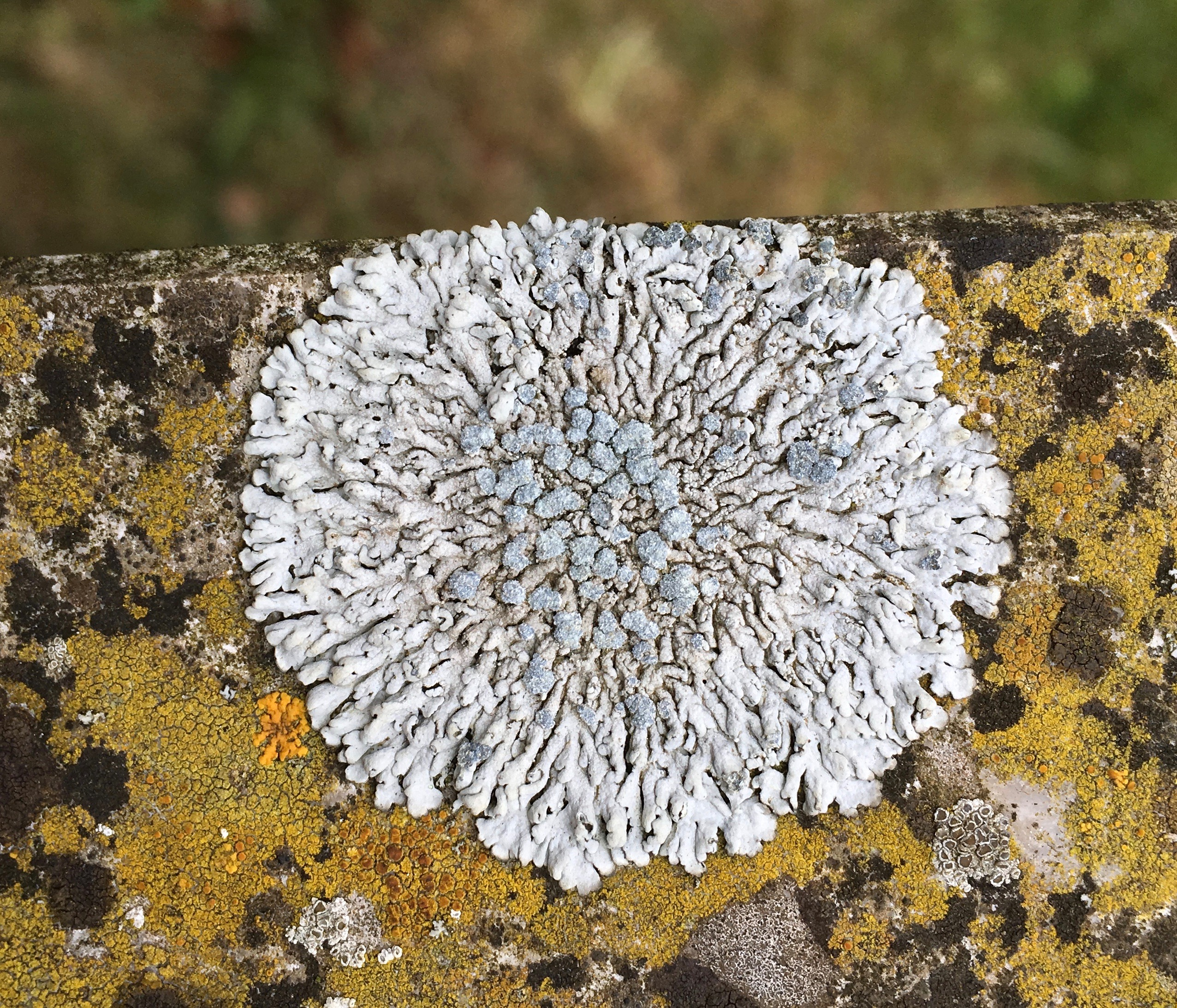
Physcia caesia (foliose)

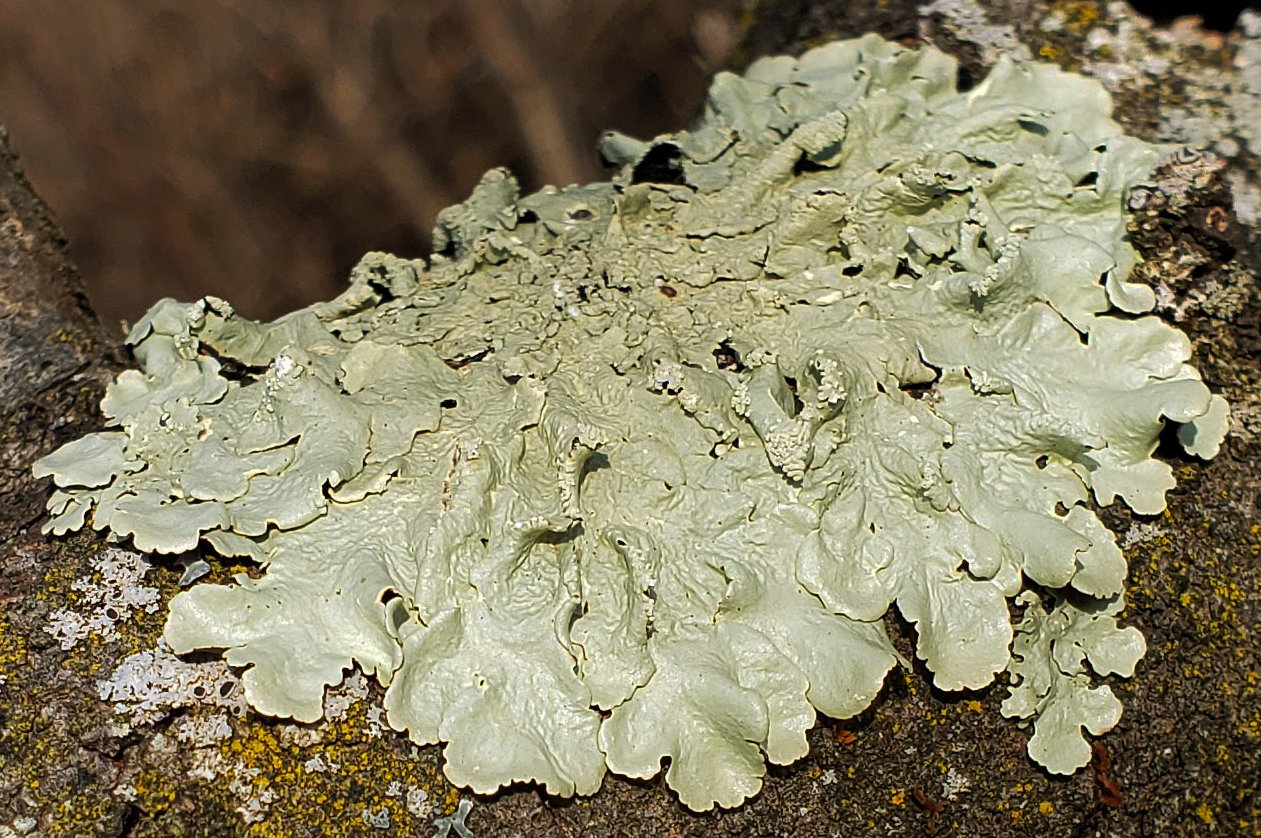
Flavoparmelia caperata (foliose)

=== Endemism and restricted ranges ===
Regional lichen floras commonly include taxa regarded as endemic, sometimes even at the level of genera. Endemic ranges are consistent with dispersal limitation in some lichen fungi, and reported centres of endemism include Mediterranean climate regions, Macaronesia, and the Galápagos Islands. Restricted ranges do not always imply poor dispersal; proposed explanations include narrow habitat requirements, limited time since speciation, or strong photobiont specificity when compatible algal strains are unavailable locally. In lecideoid lichens (a group of mostly crustose species), some taxa previously regarded as Antarctic or Sub-Antarctic endemics (or as bipolar) are also known from montane regions of western North America, raising questions about how common truly endemic Antarctic lichen-forming fungi are.

Approximately 60% of foliicolous lichens are restricted to one of three major tropical areas, whereas vascular plants were almost entirely restricted to a single one of those areas. A 2003 estimate placed 539 foliicolous lichen species in the Neotropics, including 252 endemic species (47%), while the African Paleotropics were estimated to include 309 species, including 56 endemic species (18%).

=== Oceanic islands and archipelagos ===
Oceanic archipelagos are natural tests for island biogeography because their isolation lets researchers ask two basic questions: do lichen floras mainly reflect repeated long-distance colonization from continents or diversification after arrival, and how often do lineages fail to persist because of local extinction? Classic island-biogeography models treat richness as a balance between immigration and extinction that varies with island area and isolation. Later "general dynamic" approaches also emphasise how islands change through time (ontogeny) and how niche opportunities shift as islands grow and erode. In lichen studies, these questions often become: are lichens dispersal-limited, do populations establish after rare arrivals (including founder effects), and does isolation promote endemic lineages rather than repeated recolonization? In Macaronesia, endemic taxa of Nephroma are interpreted as neo-endemics that originated after island emergence, forming two sister clades distinct from widespread relatives. In Hawaii, the neotropical genus Lobariella forms a single clade (monophyletic) of three presumably endemic species, described as a local "micro-radiation" (a small, local burst of diversification). A Gran Canaria endemic in Xanthoparmelia falls within an East African clade and was dated to the Pliocene, consistent with long-distance colonization followed by isolation rather than deep shared geological history.

=== Disjunctions and southern-hemisphere patterns ===
Disjunct distributions, in which related taxa occur in widely separated regions, are a recurring feature of lichen biogeography. Austral lichen floras (the lichen-forming fungi of southern regions) often show disjunct ranges linking New Zealand, South America, and the subantarctic islands. These similarities are strongest at the level of genera rather than individual species, and two major groupings are recognized within austral lichen mycobiotas. Paleoaustral lichens represent Gondwanan groups with limited capacity for long-distance dispersal. They occur in cool temperate biomes, often in forests dominated by Nothofagus, or in shrublands or grasslands, and commonly show disjunct distributions. Neoaustral lichens are characterized as taxa that dispersed after the fragmentation of Gondwanaland, often producing many vegetative diaspores that can be transported by birds, ocean currents, or the Antarctic Circumpolar Current.

Bipolar distributions involve occurrences at high latitudes in both hemispheres, with species absent or nearly absent from the tropics. Galloway groups bipolar lichens with alpine/tundra-like habitats in both hemispheres (e.g., bogs, fens, grasslands, fellfield) and reports them frequently from periglacial settings, especially on subantarctic islands. The literature uses several labels for these patterns, including "bipolar", "amphitropical", and "antitropical". In each case, the term refers to taxa recorded from both hemispheres that are scarce in tropical lowlands. Because many such lichens also occur on high mountains at lower latitudes, some authors instead define the pattern by habitat rather than by latitude alone. Bipolar distributions appear relatively common among arctic lichens, but interpretation can be affected by unequal sampling between hemispheres. It can be difficult to distinguish a circumpolar distribution in one hemisphere from a truly bipolar pattern, and additional records can change how distributions are interpreted. One estimate puts roughly 50% of the Antarctic lichen flora in the bipolar or cosmopolitan categories. Phylogenetic analyses of lecideoid lichens using two DNA regions (ITS and MCM7) recovered closely related clades containing specimens from Antarctica or the South American Sub-Antarctic alongside specimens from montane western North America, supporting a biogeographic connection between these regions.

Compared with vascular plants, lichens show a higher incidence of intercontinental disjunctions, spanning patterns from subcosmopolitan and Holarctic ranges to pantropical, Europe–North America, eastern North America–Japan, and South America–Africa distributions. In the Hypogymnioid clade, divergence-time estimation (molecular clock dating) and ancestral-range reconstruction suggest a long-distance dispersal event from the Northern to the Southern Hemisphere during the Miocene, followed by diversification of a clade largely restricted to the Southern Hemisphere.

=== Quaternary refugia and post-glacial recolonization ===
Quaternary glacial cycles repeatedly forced ranges to contract into refugia and then expand again. As a result, present distributions often reflect where populations persisted through ice maxima and how they recolonized deglaciated landscapes after the last glacial maximum (c. 23,000–18,000 years before present). Because post-glacial expansions often proceed through founder events at the advancing range margin, recently colonized regions typically retain only a subset of the genetic variation found in refugial areas. This expectation is sometimes summarized as a "southern richness, northern purity" pattern. Molecular phylogeography uses these genetic signatures to infer population history, identify candidate refugia, and reconstruct recolonization routes. Work on cryptic refugia at higher latitudes suggests that simple southern-refugia-only scenarios can be misleading. In lichens, phylogeographic work in arctic and boreal regions remains sparse, but reviews report examples consistent with both periglacial survival and recolonization from southern refugia, and note that western North America has acted as a centre of genetic diversity in some boreal taxa, while the role of Beringia in lichen refugial history remains largely untested. Population-level case studies still link Quaternary climate oscillations to lichen demography. For example, Bayesian skyline analyses (a DNA-based method for inferring past population sizes) in several lineages of the Holarctic macrolichen genus Melanohalea infer Pleistocene population-size increases that began before the end of the last glacial maximum, and multi-locus reconstructions (using multiple DNA markers) for the bipolar terricolous lichen Cetraria aculeata support a Northern Hemisphere origin with Pleistocene southward range expansion into South America, followed by later contraction and regional isolation as populations became separated.

== Global floristic regions ==
At the broadest scale, lichen biogeography asks how the world's lichen floras are partitioned into major regions and what large-scale patterns emerge when regional species lists are compared. Global-scale comparisons involve defining geographic regions, assembling species lists for each, and grouping regions by checklist similarity to produce a dendrogram (a tree diagram) of affinities. One global analysis grouped lichen floras into four main biogeographic units: Holarctic, Subantarctic–Australian, Oceanian, and Pantropical. In that analysis, Pacific-island floras grouped apart from the pantropical cluster rather than within it. Across their dataset, species were recorded from a mean of 2.2 floristic regions. Similarity-based algorithms can be sensitive to sampling bias in species distribution data. Network approaches have been proposed as an alternative way to delimit biogeographical regions, especially where transition zones blur boundaries.

A quantitative cluster analysis of lichen distribution data found that the main global subdivision is between a Gondwanan element and a Laurasian element. At smaller scales, patterns mainly reflect local climate. At the largest scales, the analysis treats the primary split as geological rather than climatic. In the main run, the Gondwanan element includes the Neotropics and Caribbean, sub-Saharan Africa, southern India through Malesia and Australasia, Antarctica, and Pacific regions; this analysis presents this grouping as broadly consistent with geological Gondwana, albeit with mismatches at the margins.

Another line of work focuses on drivers and traits, rather than checklist similarity alone. Fungal secondary metabolites and their chemical properties have been proposed as drivers that shape lichen distributions through both ecology and evolution. At continental scales, ecoregion-based units have also been used as comparative frameworks for lichen distributions. North American distributions are often highly localized, with most species from only one or two ecoregions.

=== Boundary regions and anomalies ===
Large-scale regionalizations also produce transition zones and anomalies: regional assignments can shift between analyses or cut across expected geological boundaries. In the Americas, the checklist-based boundary between the two main lichen elements falls north of the geological boundary at the Isthmus of Panama, with the split placed within Mexico. Florida and Mexico fall within the Gondwanan element in some runs, but their placement shifts with the algorithm and dataset used. The Indian subcontinent is geologically part of Gondwana, and most of India grouped with Gondwana in the cluster analysis, while northern and north-western provinces adjacent to the Himalayas grouped with Laurasia and Assam and other parts of north-eastern India grouped with Gondwana.

Tropical Southeast Asia represents a biogeographic puzzle: it clusters with Gondwana despite its Laurasian geology, possibly because later arrivals from India and Australasia outweighed the indigenous element in the checklist signal. The same analysis did not treat Wallace's Line as a significant boundary for lichens. The clustering distinguishes Australia from Malesia/Southeast Asia, but the boundary does not coincide with Wallace's Line; limited knowledge of the boundary-region flora is noted. For lichenicolous (lichen-dwelling) fungi, an analysis using grouped regions (60 regions; 4,361 species–region records) yields the same primary Gondwana/Laurasia split; East Africa is the stated exception, tentatively linked to limited data.

== Processes shaping lichen distributions ==
Explanations for lichen ranges combine three themes: how propagules move and establish, how environments filter survival and growth, and how lineages diversify and shift their ranges through time.

=== Dispersal and establishment ===
Lichen-forming fungi disperse either as sexual spores or as vegetative (mitotic) propagules such as conidia, soredia, isidia, and fragments of thallus. Sexual reproduction produces fungal spores alone, so successful re-lichenization usually requires the fungus to find a compatible photobiont after dispersal. Asexual propagation can occur via soredia, isidia, or thallus fragments that include both fungal hyphae and photobiont cells, enabling both partners to disperse together. Because soredia and isidia package both partners together (and may carry part of the microbiome), they can reduce the need to find a new compatible partner after dispersal.

How far lichens spread depends on what is dispersed and on the vectors that transport propagules. Sexual spores can range from a few micrometres across to hundreds of micrometres long, and experimental work suggests they tolerate stressors such as ultraviolet better than conidia. Conidia are extremely small, and they have been proposed as especially suited to intercontinental transport compared with heavier vegetative propagules (and perhaps even ascospores). Wind is a major vector for propagules, while rain and runoff are routes for short-distance transport. Leaf-dwelling rainforest understorey lichens have been inferred to disperse mainly by rain splash over distances of less than 1 metre. On that basis, estimated spread rates are about 500 km per million years, implying roughly 5–10 million years to cross a continental rainforest block. Birds are often implicated as agents of long-distance lichen dispersal, including by carrying lichens as nesting material, but direct evidence for long-distance transport of lichen diaspores by birds remains limited. Anthropogenic introductions may contribute to biotic homogenization (making biotas more similar), including in isolated areas such as Antarctica. Reported human-induced introductions of lichen-forming fungi are scarce.

Dispersal alone is insufficient: establishment from sexual spores can be rare if compatible partners are not available where spores land. Some authors interpret some sexually reproducing lichens as beginning as parasites on other lichens, which may provide access to a photobiont. Several lichen species establish on newly exposed rocks (e.g., glacier forefields or young volcanic islands) within a decade after exposure. In a dust-based metabarcoding survey, propagules from asexually reproducing lichens showed nearly twice the site occupancy of propagules from sexually reproducing species, consistent with higher establishment probability when diaspores disperse with both symbiotic partners. In that survey, lichen community diversity and composition did not differ significantly between urban and rural homes. Richness also did not vary with human population density. This pattern was interpreted as reflecting propagule distributions rather than established lichens.

=== Ecological filtering and microhabitat controls ===
Many lichen distributions are constrained not only by regional climate, but also by fine-scale conditions at the substrate that govern hydration, light, and temperature. In Wisconsin pine barrens, Cladonia microdistributions correlate with species-specific photosynthetic responses to temperature. Modelling work shows that single variables can suggest long windows of activity for Usnea sphacelata, but models that combine light, temperature, and humidity predict much shorter growth periods. Water source (rain, dew, and humid air) interact with light to structure epiphytic distributions, and these hydration inputs vary across spatial and temporal scales. Across epiphytic lichens, the availability of rain, dew, and humid-air hydration varies from regions and landscapes down to stands and individual trees, and the balance between hydration and light differs among those microhabitats. In woodland epiphytes, microhabitat heterogeneity can create local microclimates (microrefugia) within a broader climatic gradient, with influential factors including topographic wetness and physical exposure at landscape scale and height on the trunk (bole), trunk lean, and bark water holding capacity at tree scale. Substrate properties can also filter epiphytic assemblages; in an urban survey, tree species explained lichen colonization better than bark surface pH alone.

Substrate type is one major axis structuring lichen distributions, because the physical and chemical properties of the colonized surface interact with microclimate. In a Norwegian coastal saxicolous (rock-dwelling) community, species composition varied with vegetation cover, sunlight exposure, and maritime influence, while within-community distributions of saxicolous lichens were linked to altitude, slope and exposure, seabird-derived nutrient enrichment, and bedrock geochemistry. In semi-arid eastern Australia, Eldridge and Tozer related the distributions of soil-crust lichens to annual rainfall, soil pH and calcium carbonate levels, plant cover, sheet erosion, organic carbon and crust cover, with sparse crust communities on unstable dunes and active floodplains.

Atmospheric chemistry can also shape lichen distributions at landscape and regional scales, especially in epiphytic communities. Hawksworth and Rose proposed a qualitative scale for estimating sulphur dioxide (SO_{2}) air pollution in England and Wales using epiphytic lichens on trees. Later work has increasingly focused on reactive nitrogen: van Herk and colleagues related epiphytic lichen occurrence at European monitoring sites to precipitation chemistry and modelled how multiple acidophytic species respond to nitrogen concentrations in precipitation. In western Oregon and Washington, Geiser and Neitlich used epiphytic macrolichen communities to describe combined air-pollution and climate gradients across forest plots, and discussed ammonia from agriculture among the sources contributing to regional nitrogen exposure.

=== Gene flow and population structure ===
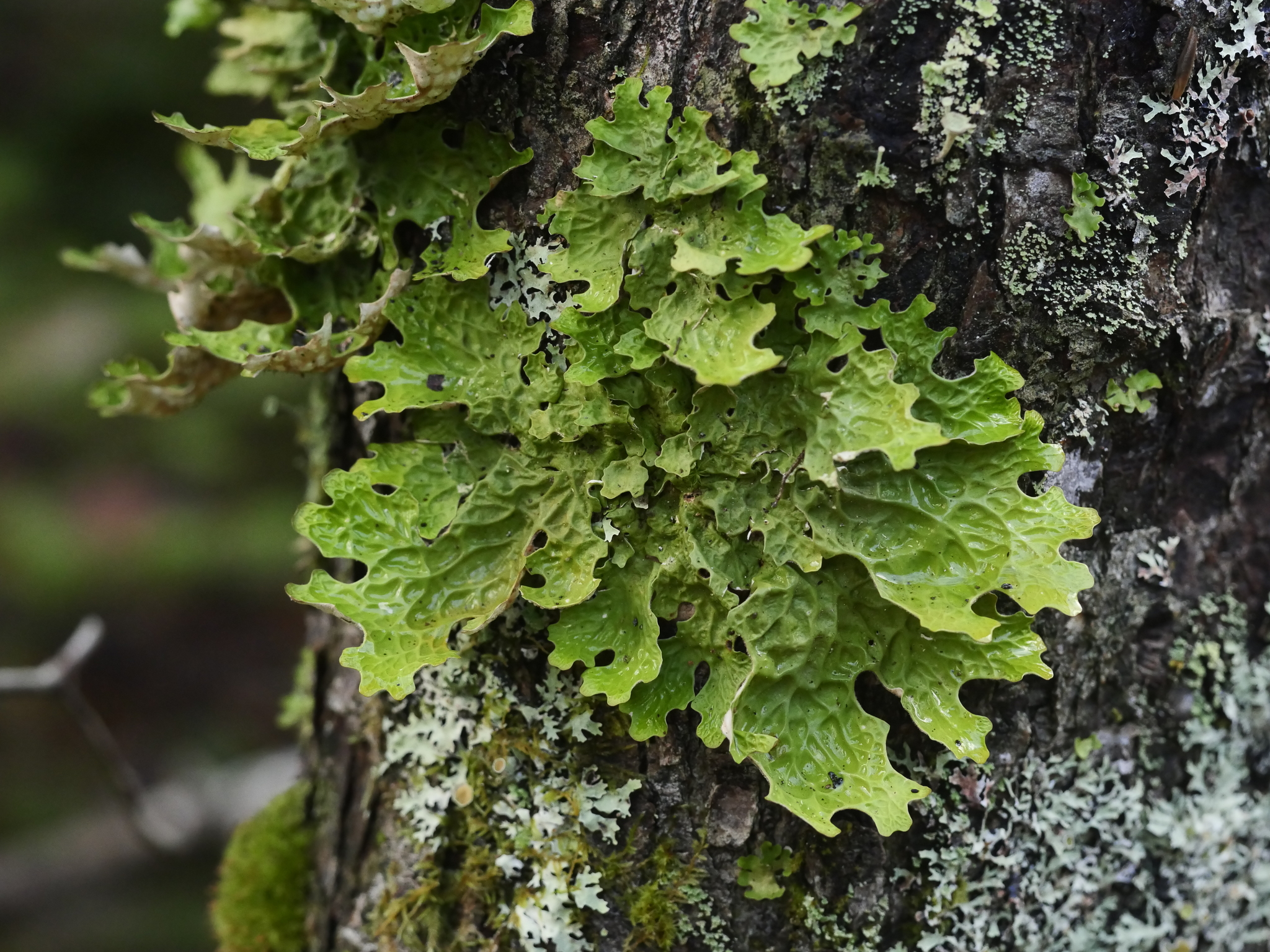
Lobaria pulmonaria (lungwort lichen), a bark-dwelling species frequently used in studies of gene flow and population structure in lichen-forming fungi

Landscape genetics examines how geographic and environmental factors affect gene flow and genetic structure across populations. Dispersal differs from gene flow: dispersal has evolutionary consequences only when propagules establish and reproduce. Most phylogeographic studies report restricted gene flow among lichen-fungal populations and rare intercontinental dispersal.

Most landscape-genetic studies of lichen-forming fungi have focused on the epiphyte Lobaria pulmonaria. Microsatellite-based studies show genetic differentiation among populations in Switzerland and British Columbia, with further differentiation between coastal and mainland populations in western North America, and evidence for regional population differentiation and isolation by distance across western North America and central Europe. Microsatellite allele sizes differ strongly between European and western North American populations in both symbionts of L. pulmonaria, consistent with rare intercontinental dispersal of the pair. North American populations of L. pulmonaria and its green-algal photobiont Symbiochloris reticulata comprise two main gene pools (Pacific Northwest and eastern) with little admixture, and diversity metrics were higher in the western populations.

Some high-latitude taxa show high migration rates and weak geographic structure. Strong wind connectivity among sites is one proposed explanation and could facilitate long-distance dispersal. Evidence for past intercontinental dispersal can fade with time, because demographic and genetic signals erode over many generations. For some East Asia–eastern North America disjunctions in lichen mycobionts, published sequence results conflict with long isolation. Mycoblastus sanguinarius includes near-identical haplotypes across the Russian Far East and eastern North America, and Rinodina subparieta includes Asian and North American sequences within the same clade.

=== Photobionts and symbiont interactions ===
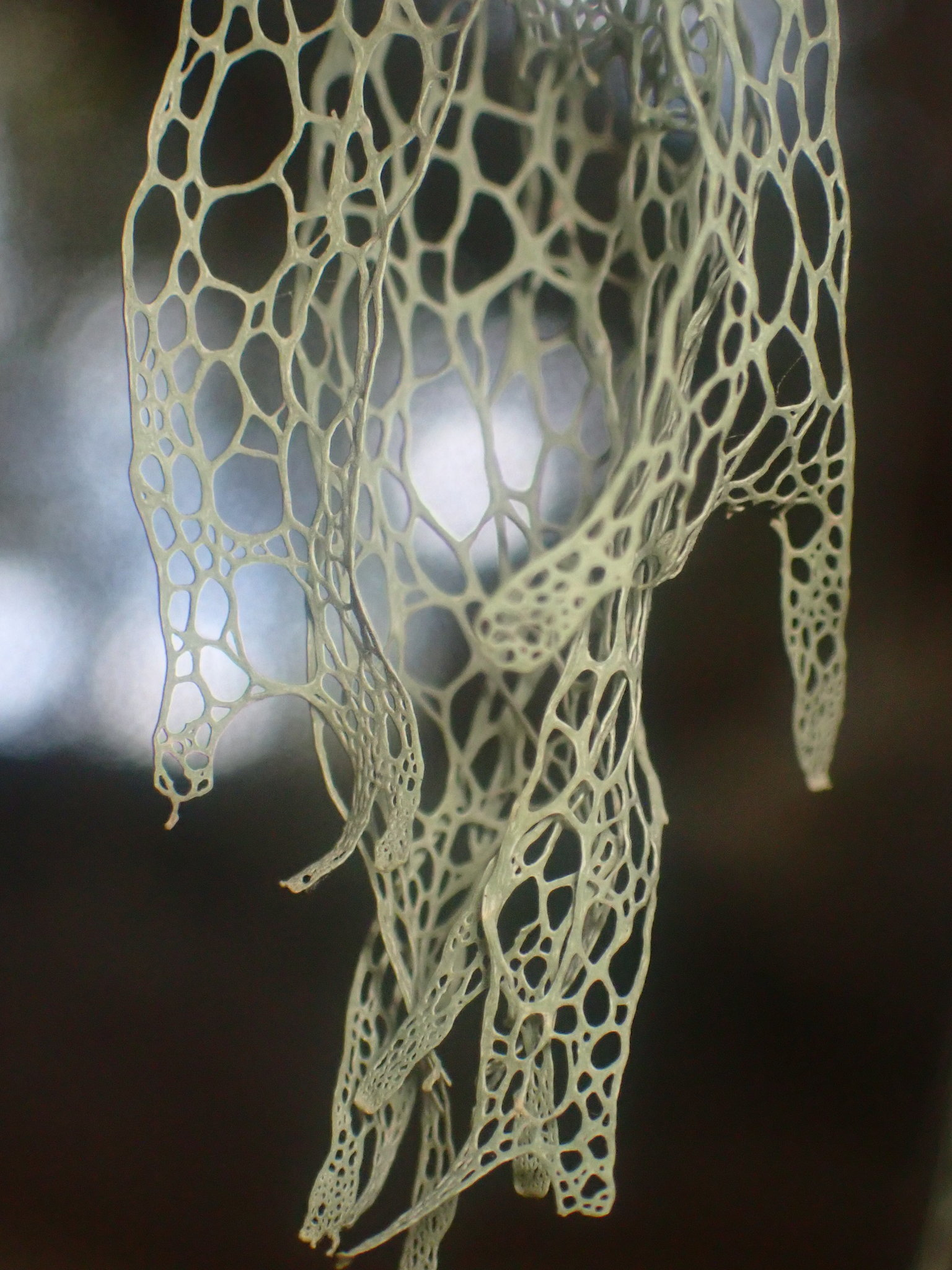
Ramalina menziesii (lace lichen), a study system in which both the fungal partner (mycobiont) and photosynthetic partner (photobiont) have been examined in biogeographical work.

Photobionts can differ in their environmental preferences, and these preferences have been proposed to limit the ecological niches available to lichens, supporting the idea of habitat-specific lichen guilds in which lichen communities in similar habitats tend to share the same photobionts. Photobionts can matter biogeographically because their ecology and availability, and how selectively fungi associate with them, can constrain where lichens occur.

Several lichen systems have been used to investigate how photobionts contribute to distributions, including Cetraria aculeata, Ramalina menziesii, and Lobaria pulmonaria. In Cetraria aculeata, photobiont switching can increase geographic range and expand ecological niches by allowing association with locally adapted algal partners. Work on Ramalina menziesii links its distribution to photobiont specialization (Trebouxia decolorans), geography, and climate, with algal specialization on local environmental conditions allowing association with locally adapted photobiont strains. Microsatellite analyses of Symbiochloris reticulata photobionts from Lobaria pulmonaria thalli recovered an east–west split paralleling the fungal partner, and photobiont genetic distance was strongly correlated with geographic distance and significantly associated with actual evapotranspiration (water loss from land and vegetation) rates.

Associations with Trebouxia occur across a wide range of regions, whereas Trentepohlia-associated lichens are concentrated in warmer zones, including Mediterranean, subtropical, and tropical regions. Lower cold resistance in Trentepohlia-associated lichens has been proposed as one contributor to their warmer geographic distributions. Photobiont exchange (horizontal transmission) between thalli appears widespread, even among lichens that propagate vegetatively, and compatible photobionts have been reported living outside thalli, including records from the McMurdo Dry Valleys of Antarctica.

=== Diversification and historical range evolution ===
Historical biogeographic studies combine time-calibrated phylogenies with geographic reconstructions to investigate diversification and range evolution in lichen-forming fungi. Ancestral-area reconstructions suggest that the large genus Xanthoparmelia originated in Africa, specifically South Africa, near the Oligocene–Miocene boundary (23.3 million years ago). Subsequent diversification was linked to global aridification and the spread of open habitats. Ancestral-range reconstructions also supported multiple independent dispersals from Africa followed by radiations in other continents. Because the continents were already separated by the early Miocene, diversification in Xanthoparmelia was interpreted as mainly occurring within continents, and infrequent intercontinental exchange was attributed to long-distance dispersal. The Parmeliaceae genus Flavoparmelia likely originated in southern South America at the Eocene–Oligocene transition (about 33.2 million years ago). The authors interpreted the genus as shaped by both processes: vicariance contributed to its origin, while long-distance dispersal produced subcosmopolitan distributions.

DNA sequence data have also shown that nominally widespread morphospecies can comprise multiple species-level lineages with contrasting distributions. The Rhizoplaca melanophthalma complex comprises multiple species-level lineages, with some lineages having broad intercontinental distributions and others known only from western North America. In Xanthoparmelia, phylogenetic analyses have recovered multiple representatives of nominal taxa in separate, well-supported clades, a pattern interpreted as consistent with phenotype-based delimitation sometimes misrepresenting diversity in lichen-forming fungi.

=== Anthropogenic effects ===
At landscape scales, human disturbance can reduce lichen diversity even where climate varies only modestly. In the southern Appalachian Mountains (northern Alabama, United States), a taxonomically complete inventory across 47 plots of 1 ha recorded 509 lichen species spanning all growth forms and substrates. Species richness increased steadily with habitat quality (lower disturbance), and disturbance accounted for most of the differences in richness among sites across microlichens and macrolichens, growth forms, and reproductive strategies; other measured factors such as precipitation, rock exposure, and forest structure had weaker or more group-specific effects. Industrial smoke and sulphur dioxide (SO_{2}) historically produced sharp "lichen desert" patterns around cities and major point sources, and early bioindicator work mapped epiphytic assemblages along SO_{2} gradients. In inner London, mean annual SO_{2} concentrations declined from about 200–250 to <130 μg m^{−3} between 1960 and 1980. Under these cleaner-air conditions, recolonization of tree-bark lichens was documented in north-west London. The resurvey inferred that many sites were recolonized within roughly 3–7 years, but cautioned that London was unlikely to regain many of the species lost over the previous two centuries. Recolonization did not simply reverse earlier losses: in London, species did not return in the same sequence in which they disappeared ("zone skipping"), an outcome linked to colonist availability and other biological constraints.

As sulphur emissions fell across Europe, reactive nitrogen became an increasing driver of change in epiphytic communities, with ammonia (NH_{3}) and nitrogen oxides (NO_{x}) differing in their dominant sources and in how far they are transported and deposited. Because NH_{3} deposition declines steeply with distance from sources (often within a few hundred metres), local nitrogen enrichment can raise bark pH and shift communities towards nitrophytic (nitrogen-loving) taxa. Along NH_{3} gradients, acidophyte-rich assemblages have been reported to decline before some nitrophytic species become established. In the Dutch province of Friesland, mean NH_{3} concentrations in Southeast Friesland fell from 9.7 to 6.6 μg m^{−3} between 1996 and 2003; this coincided with a rapid increase in N-sensitive species and a decline in N-tolerant macrolichens. Reviews from western North America likewise report that lichen communities can respond to relatively low nitrogen inputs (about 3–8 kg N per hectare per year). Enrichment can favour nitrophilous taxa while reducing many pollution-sensitive species, including a disproportionate number of cyanolichens in some regions.

Habitat loss, fragmentation, and changes in forest structure also shape lichen distributions by altering habitat continuity, edge conditions, and microclimates, particularly for epiphytic taxa associated with long-standing woodlands. Lobaria pulmonaria, widely used as an indicator of unpolluted, undisturbed forest conditions, has been reported to decline over the last century in association with forest management and air pollution, illustrating how land use and atmospheric chemistry can act together. In Mediterranean forest fragments in central Spain, Belinchón and colleagues found that host-tree diameter and local habitat features strongly predicted L. pulmonaria occurrence, while patch quality and the surrounding matrix helped explain variation in abundance and cover among fragments. In long-recorded British woodlands such as Epping Forest, major shifts in epiphytic floras coincided with peak SO_{2} pollution (with sensitive taxa nearly eliminated), and the assemblages returning under cleaner air did not fully match earlier herbarium records.

Cities such as London can support persistent lichen populations even under heavy pollution, but the urban flora can reorganize as SO_{2} declines and traffic-related NO_{x} and particulate exposure become more prominent. In central London, roadside monitoring and transplant experiments coincided with turnover in the lichen flora and an increasing share of nitrogen- and particle-tolerant species, including taxa not previously recorded from urban areas. In Oregon and Washington, nitrogen-enriched zones are characterized by nitrophilous lichens such as Xanthoria, Physcia, and Candelaria, while many epiphytic forage lichens and nitrogen-fixing cyanolichens become scarce or absent in the same landscapes. Together, these records show that improving air quality can still coincide with substantial turnover, because the recolonizing assemblage does not fully match historical records and can track the modern pollutant mix rather than the pre-industrial flora.

== Methods and data sources ==
Scientists study lichen biogeographic patterns through checklist comparisons, DNA-based analyses of population genetics and phylogeography, and work combining symbiont phylogeography with species-distribution modelling. Early lichen biogeography grew out of floristics (describing and cataloguing regional floras): distributions were compiled from regional floras and checklists and interpreted in biogeographic terms such as centres of origin and routes of spread, an approach aligned with the wider migrationist tradition in biogeography. Later work also applied vicariance-oriented and other frameworks by treating distributions as presence/absence across defined area units. As checklist databases expanded, global comparisons became more quantitative, including clustering analyses that grouped Takhtajan's floristic regions by how much their checklists overlap. In parallel, wider use of DNA sequencing and phylogenetic methods made phylogeography increasingly feasible for lichens and supported model-based reconstructions of range evolution.

=== Checklist- and occurrence-based approaches ===
One long-standing approach treats distribution as records on a map: species lists or occurrence data are assembled for defined regions and then compared quantitatively. Feuerer and Hawksworth compared lichen species lists among the floristic regions defined by the botanist Armen Takhtajan. Using these regions as their framework, they analysed checklist overlap using 132 geographical units and a preliminary global list (18,882 names). They then applied nearest-neighbour clustering to Jaccard similarity values (a measure of checklist overlap) to group regions. Checklist-based approaches are sensitive to uneven study intensity and recording bias. Regional synonymy can push in the opposite direction by making the same species appear under different names. Collecting gaps and overlapping compilations also limit global comparisons.

In checklist-based clustering, similarity between regions can be quantified by coefficients based on checklist size and overlap, and the choice of coefficient can affect the amount of noise where study intensity varies among regions. Mixed-coefficient approaches have been used to reduce problems associated with uneven study intensity and biased sampling. Despite variation among coefficients and clustering algorithms, the largest-scale subdivisions remain broadly recognizable.

=== Phylogeography and molecular systematics ===
Phylogeography uses genetic lineages to investigate how populations came to be distributed across geography, interpreting patterns in terms of past range shifts, fragmentation, and dispersal. DNA-based studies are a strong basis for evaluating wide and disjunct ranges, especially when used to test hypotheses about divergence among populations from different regions or continents.

Morphospecies-based studies can be misleading when broadly reported taxa contain cryptic, reproductively isolated lineages; present-day range maps alone cannot identify the historical processes that produced a given distribution pattern. Usnea sphacelata illustrates how species delimitation can alter inferred distributions. A monographic treatment reported it from a wide set of northern and southern localities. Later DNA studies concluded that U. sphacelata (in the strict sense) is absent from western North America and Antarctica, where material corresponds to U. lambii. On that basis, U. sphacelata was treated as circumpolar in the Northern Hemisphere, extending into the Southern Hemisphere in high Andean localities as far south as Patagonia; records from New Zealand were treated as needing molecular confirmation.

=== Historical biogeography modelling ===
Multi-gene, time-calibrated phylogenies can be combined with statistical models of geographic range change to estimate ancestral areas and to infer how dispersal and local extinction produced present-day distributions. In Xanthoparmelia, ancestral ranges were reconstructed with BioGeoBEARS (software that compares alternative range-evolution models), including versions that treat range history as a balance of dispersal, local extinction, and range splitting during speciation, and variants that also allow rare founder-event ("jump") dispersal when lineages diverge. Using the same framework for Hypogymnioid lichens, the best-supported reconstruction suggested a Holarctic ancestral range for the group's most recent common ancestor (Europe and North America, or Europe, North America, and eastern Asia/Indo-Malayan regions).

=== Species distribution modelling ===
Species distribution modelling is a potentially important tool in biogeographic research, although only relatively few studies of lichen-forming fungi incorporate modelling approaches to elucidate biogeographic patterns. Distribution modelling commonly uses statistical pattern-recognition methods to relate occurrence records to predictor variables, in order to estimate ecological requirements. Accuracy depends on how well the predictors capture real drivers, and on how occurrence data are handled. Macroclimatic variables are important predictors for many lichens. Incorporating microhabitat variation is challenging, and survey design plus model evaluation impose practical constraints. Even with relatively well characterized occurrence data, model outputs can fail to match known occurrences. Hindcast models for L. pulmonaria at 22,000 years before present predicted that suitable climate in eastern North America was largely confined to the southeastern United States, while the west retained a broad belt of suitable habitat along the Pacific coast, consistent with a larger coastal refugium. Bioclimatic distribution models often assume bioclimatic equilibrium: broad-scale climate largely determines where a species occurs. Tests of bioclimatic equilibrium in 25 lichens found that 24% did not show statistical congruence with climate models.

=== Genomic and environmental sequencing approaches ===
High-throughput sequencing has broadened phylogenetic inference and the ability to detect lichen DNA in environmental samples, including dispersal-stage propagules. Metagenomic reads from lichen samples are increasingly available, but their routine use in phylogenetic studies remains largely untested; with suitable genomic references, hundreds to thousands of homologous markers could potentially be recovered from such data. Environmental DNA (eDNA) sampling and next-generation sequencing technologies offer one route to detecting whether animals, air, or water carry lichen-forming fungal DNA consistent with dispersal.

A citizen science survey in the contiguous United States sampled settled dust from exterior home door trim and used ITS1 metabarcoding to identify lichen-forming fungal propagules; door trim acted as a passive collector of spores and microscopic thallus fragments rather than a substrate bearing developed lichens. Because the sequences came from propagules, the resulting maps were treated as potential distributions (earliest developmental stages) and contrasted with "observed distributions" derived from herbarium and inventory records.

== Applications ==
Conservation planning increasingly uses biogeographic evidence to guide decisions and to assess how lichen communities may respond to environmental change.

=== Conservation biology ===
Lichens present challenges for conservation because symbiosis complicates what counts as a viable population and because habitat requirements do not necessarily match those of other organisms. Most lichens lack a formal conservation status, and lichen conservation receives less attention from governmental organizations and other institutions than more familiar and charismatic groups. As a result, standard approaches may fail to protect vulnerable lichens and lichen communities. Lichen conservation commonly focuses on maintaining habitat quality, ensuring sufficient habitat size, and preserving connectivity between suitable sites. In North America, L. pulmonaria forms genetically distinct eastern and western gene pools with very low admixture, a structure that supports treating them as separate conservation units.

Protected-area programmes can be limited when they rely mainly on vascular plant data. The Natura 2000 Programme is the European Union's main instrument for nature conservation, focusing on threatened habitats and the long-term survival of species, and it can include key habitats for some lichens while being relatively ineffective for Mediterranean lichens. More generally, reserve networks based mainly on vascular plant data may be ineffective for neglected groups such as lichens. Lichen surveys are critical for assessing abundance, dynamics, and viability, and lichen conservation depends on improved prioritization of vulnerable habitats and species, interdisciplinary collaboration, incorporation of population and landscape genetics into policy decisions, and increased bio-inventory survey coverage that includes lichens.

=== Climate change and environmental change ===
Human activities drive changes in temperature, carbon dioxide, rainfall, UV radiation, ozone, acidification, and nitrification, and some of these shifts directly affect lichen communities. Protected-area selection needs to account for rapid climate change, which can alter conditions so that protected areas no longer support the taxa or ecosystems they were intended to conserve. Lichens are widely used as bioindicators because many are long-lived and show measurable responses to climatic and atmospheric-chemistry gradients.

Climate change is forecast to drive major ecological shifts and shifts in species distributions, but responses of most species in vulnerable habitats remain uncertain. Detailed, long-term monitoring is essential for assessing biologically meaningful shifts in community composition and species distributions. Some authors consider evidence for climatic equilibrium insufficient to infer that lichens will track human-induced climate change, given the unprecedented rate and magnitude of Quaternary climate change and the increasingly fragmented habitat structure that affects dispersal. Examples include projected northward expansion in the UK for southern elements of Britain's lichen flora and other species adapted to warmer climates, disproportionate threat to montane species, and projected contrasts in Norway, where a warmer, humid climate was treated as potentially beneficial for Hypogymnia physodes but detrimental to Melanohalea olivacea.

== Limitations and research gaps ==
Inference in lichen biogeography is limited by uneven sampling, incomplete checklists, unsettled taxonomy (including cryptic diversity), and poorly resolved photobiont species boundaries.

=== Sampling, checklist completeness, and study intensity ===
Uneven study intensity among neighbouring regions can distort checklist-based similarity measures. Dataset size and coverage depend on published distribution sources and access to online checklists. Limited permission to use some online datasets can restrict completeness. In global checklist comparisons aligned with Takhtajan's floristic regions, region size and placement rely on expert judgement rather than on calculated boundaries. An additional limitation is uncertainty about whether these regions exist as discrete units, and whether lichen distributions conform to the same kinds of units. Other limits include few checklists for some regions, partly overlapping compilations, and collecting gaps, and geographical units with no recorded lichen species in the underlying dataset.

Distribution maps for many lichens remain incomplete, and floras of remote regions are often poorly known in part because lichens are often overlooked in vegetation surveys and because many species occupy large, underexplored ranges with intercontinental disjunctions. Population-level work in arctic and alpine systems faces practical barriers: scarcity of collections from remote areas, frequent overlooking of small crustose species, morphological variability that complicates identification, and taxonomic uncertainty (especially in microlichens) that can make floristic surveys unreliable for defining sampling targets. Historical biogeographic analysis has been applied relatively rarely to lichen-forming fungi, in part because many species are widely distributed, taxonomy and distributions remain incomplete (especially in the tropics and for crustose microlichens), and phylogenies remain uncertain for many taxa. Lichen biogeography in eastern Asia remains sparsely documented, particularly for crustose lichens. The lack of a systematic Rinodina revision for eastern Asia has left a gap in interpreting the genus's global biogeography.

=== Taxonomic uncertainty and cryptic diversity ===
Biogeographic inferences based on morphospecies can be misleading when broadly reported taxa include cryptic species that are genetically distinct and have narrower ranges; present-day distributions alone cannot identify the historical processes that produced them, because similar ranges can arise through different histories. Molecular studies indicate that some taxa believed to have broad intercontinental distributions comprise distinct species in different continents or regions. Morphology does not always track genetic divergence in lichen-forming fungi, and continuing range extensions keep revising distribution assumptions; as a result, endemism claims, particularly for crustose lichens, often remain uncertain.

Counts of bipolar lichens remain uncertain because many putatively bipolar taxa have not been assessed with modern species-delimitation methods; when populations are separated by great distances, delimitation requires particular caution. In the Hypogymnioid clade, several currently accepted species were not monophyletic (they did not form a single lineage) when sampled across distinct geographic areas, with multiple clades corresponding to region of origin; the authors called for re-evaluation of species boundaries in the group. In Flavoparmelia, several species delimited using phenotypic characters (e.g., soralia and chemistry) were para- or polyphyletic (their named groups did not match the DNA-based clades), including F. caperata, F. rutidota, F. soredians, and F. subcapitata.

Global species totals remain uncertain because species concepts and taxonomy are unsettled and many regions (especially in the tropics) remain poorly inventoried. They also point to a sizeable backlog of 'orphaned' names: taxa seldom seen again after description and often known only from their types. They suggest that molecular revision is needed for at least some groups if checklists are to be compared confidently, but note that old type material often yields little recoverable DNA.

=== Photobiont taxonomy and photobiont biogeography ===
Photobiont species boundaries remain unresolved, particularly in Trebouxia, where morphology has performed poorly as a way to separate species, and relatively few studies apply objective delimitation methods (for example, DNA-based approaches); this has motivated calls for a practical species-level framework for major photobiont groups. Species-level photobiont biogeography remains poorly developed because species boundaries are unsettled and new lineages continue to be discovered. Many fungi share the same photobionts, and partner choice can vary across a lichen's range. Relevant photobiont populations may also occur outside thalli (free-living or airborne), which requires broader sampling.

== See also ==
- Lichen systematics
