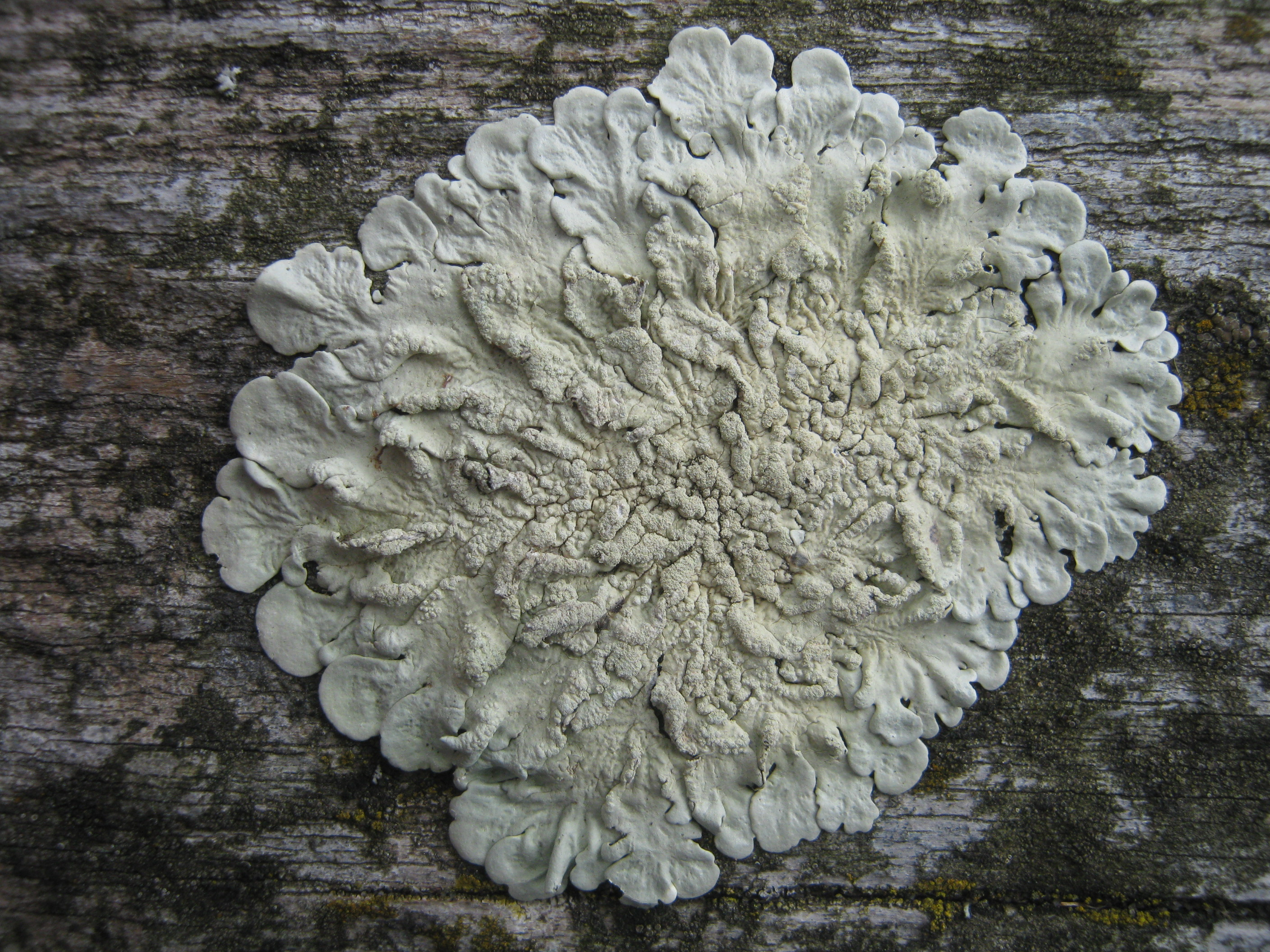
- growing on a log in Lourinhã, Portugal

Scientific classification
- Domain: Eukaryota
- Kingdom: Fungi
- Division: Ascomycota
- Class: Lecanoromycetes
- Order: Lecanorales
- Family: Parmeliaceae
- Genus: Flavoparmelia
- Species: F. soredians

Binomial name
- Flavoparmelia soredians (Nyl.) Hale (1986)

Synonyms
- Parmelia soredians Nyl. (1872); Parmelia caperata var. soredians (Nyl.) Hillmann (1936); Parmelia conspersa var. soredians (Nyl.) Boistel (1903); Pseudoparmelia soredians (Nyl.) Hale (1974)

= Flavoparmelia soredians =

Species of lichen

Flavoparmelia soredians is a widely distributed species of foliose lichen in the large family Parmeliaceae.

In the late 1990s, an increase in the frequency of Flavoparmelia soredians was noted in the Netherlands, which, until then, occurred rarely in the country. This population increase followed a decrease in the levels of the pollutant sulphur dioxide. Punctelia borreri and Flavoparmelia caperata were two other foliose species that experienced a similar increase in regional frequency during this time.

== Taxonomy ==
The lichen was first formally described by Finnish lichenologist William Nylander in 1872 as Parmelia soredians. Mason Hale transferred it to the genus Pseudoparmelia in 1974. It was later one of 17 species he transferred to Flavoparmelia in 1986.
