= Glucan endo-1,3-α-glucosidase =

Identifiers
- EC no.: 3.2.1.59
- CAS no.: 9075-84-7

Databases
- IntEnz: IntEnz view
- BRENDA: BRENDA entry
- ExPASy: NiceZyme view
- KEGG: KEGG entry
- MetaCyc: metabolic pathway
- PRIAM: profile
- PDB structures: RCSB PDB PDBe PDBsum
Search
- PMC: articles
- PubMed: articles
- NCBI: proteins

Glucan endo-1,3-α-glucosidase (EC 3.2.1.59, endo-1,3-α-glucanase, mutanase, endo-(1→3)-α-glucanase, cariogenase, cariogenanase, endo-1,3-α-D-glucanase, 1,3(1,3, 1,4)-α-D-glucan 3-glucanohydrolase) is an enzyme with systematic name 3-α-D-glucan 3-glucanohydrolase. It catalyses endohydrolysis of (1→3)-α-D-glucosidic linkages in isolichenan, pseudonigeran and nigeran

Products from pseudonigeran (1,3-α-D-glucan) are nigerose and α-D-glucose.
