= Psiloparmelia =

Scientific classification
- Domain: Eukaryota
- Kingdom: Fungi
- Division: Ascomycota
- Class: Lecanoromycetes
- Order: Lecanorales
- Family: Parmeliaceae
- Genus: Psiloparmelia; Hale (1989)

Type species
- Psiloparmelia distincta (Nyl.) Hale (1989)

Genus of fungi

Psiloparmelia is a genus of lichen belonging to the family Parmeliaceae. It contains 13 Southern Hemisphere species, most of which are found growing on rocks at high elevations in South America. There are several characteristic features of the genus that are used to distinguish it from the morphologically similar genera, such as Arctoparmelia, Flavoparmelia, and Xanthoparmelia. These include a dark, velvety lower thallus surface that usually lacks rhizines, a negative test for lichenan, and a high concentration of usnic acid and atranorin in the cortex.

== Taxonomy ==
Psiloparmelia was circumscribed by Mason Hale in 1989 with two species: Psiloparmelia arhizinosa, and the type species, Psiloparmelia distincta. Hale had previously placed this taxon (as Parmelia distincta) in the genus Xanthoparmelia. He also considered placement in Arctoparmelia due to similarities in lobe configuration, cortical chemistry, and the presence of a velvety lower surface. However, other differing characteristics precluded this classification, including a complete lack of rhizines and the presence of isolichenan in the cell walls. Hales' subsequent discovery of a species similar to P. distincta in Lesotho convinced him that these two species were sufficiently distinct from both Arctoparmelia and Xanthoparmelia to warrant the creation of a new genus, Psiloparmelia, to contain them. Some taxonomic inspiration was drawn from Vilmos Gyelnik's Parmelia sect. Xanthoparmelia subsect. Endocoerulea, which he created in 1931; it was in this subsection that Parmelia distincta was originally classified. Scanning electron microscopy was used in a 1992 study to evaluate the structure of the epicortex in Psiloparmelia, revealing the presence of a rudimentary pored epicortex, which established another character of the genus.

Nine newly described species and one new combination were added to the genus in 1992 by John Elix and Tom Nash, who published a synopsis of the genus. In 2006, molecular data supported the transfer of Xanthoparmelia peruviensis to Psiloparmelia, despite it not sharing all the morphological features characteristic of other species in the genus, particularly in having a densely rhizinate lower surface.

== Description ==
Psiloparmelia species are foliose lichens growing on rocks, to which they can be tightly or loosely attached, depending on the species. The thallus, which reaches a diameter of 3–14 cm (1.2–5.5 in), is made of irregularly shaped lobes whose margins lack cilia. The upper cortex of Psiloparmelia is a palisade plectenchyma – comprising hyphae arranged perpendicular to the surface. It is partly covered by a rudimentary epicortex (a thin homogeneous polysaccharide layer on the surface of the cortex) with pores. The texture of the upper cortex ranges from smooth to wrinkled, and it is pruinose. Pustules and soredia may be present or absent, depending on the species, while pseudocyphellae and isidia are always absent. The cell walls contain the alpha glucan molecule isolichenan. Green algae are the photobiont partner in Psiloparmelia.

The lower surface of the thallus is black and velvety. It is covered with tiny bumps (minutely papillate), and usually lacks rhizines. Most species have an even finer velvety zone around the margin that is yellowish-grey or mouse-grey. The apothecia are either attached directly to the thallus surface (adnate), or are mounted on a small stalk (substipitate); they measure 2–5 mm in diameter. The ascospores, which number eight per ascus, have a spherical to elliptical shape, and measure 9–12 by 5–9 μm.

Psiloparmelia has a relatively diverse secondary chemistry. Metabolites that have been recorded from the genus include usnic acid, atranorin, and the following β-orcinol derivatives: constipatic acid, protoconstipatic acid, diffractiac acid, fumarprotocetraric acid, hypostictic acid, 4-O-methylhypoprotocetraric acid, isousnic acid, norstictic acid, and salazinic acid. There are several other lichen acids that are found in trace amounts. The presence of these lichens compounds helps to distinguish between morphologically similar species in the genus.

== Habitat and distribution ==
Psiloparmelia is a genus of saxicolous lichens, although Psiloparmelia distincta was recently recorded growing on old bones, the first reported time on that substrate. The genus has a Southern Hemisphere distribution, with most of the species located in South America. Twelve of the thirteen species in the genus are found in high altitudes on the Andes Mountains, ranging from Ecuador and Peru south to Bolivia and northern Argentina. They are typically the most common saxicolous foliose lichens that are collected in these locales. Psiloparmelia arhizinosa is the only species to break this distributional pattern; it is found at alpine habitats at high elevations 3,000–3,300 ft (910–1,010 m) in Lesotho.

== Species ==
- Psiloparmelia arhizinosa Hale (1989) – Lesotho
- Psiloparmelia denotata Elix & T.H.Nash (1992) – Argentina; Peru
- Psiloparmelia dichotoma Elix & T.H.Nash (1992) – Peru
- Psiloparmelia diffractaica Elix & T.H.Nash (1992) – Argentina
- Psiloparmelia distincta (Nyl.) Hale (1989) – Argentina; Bolivia; Chile; Ecuador; Peru
- Psiloparmelia flavobrunnea (Müll.Arg.) Elix & T.H.Nash (1992) – Argentina; Bolivia; Chile; Ecuador; Peru
- Psiloparmelia hypostictica Elix & T.H.Nash (1992) – Argentina; Bolivia
- Psiloparmelia norstictica Elix & T.H.Nash (1992) – Argentina; Ecuador; Peru
- Psiloparmelia peruviensis (Hale) Feuerer (2006) – Peru; Bolivia
- Psiloparmelia pustulata Elix & T.H.Nash (1992) – Argentina
- Psiloparmelia salazinica Elix & T.H.Nash (1992) – Argentina; Chile
- Psiloparmelia sorediosa Elix & T.H.Nash (1992) – Argentina
- Psiloparmelia subcrustosa Elix & T.H.Nash (1992) – Peru
