= Flavoparmelia plicata =

Scientific classification
- Domain: Eukaryota
- Kingdom: Fungi
- Division: Ascomycota
- Class: Lecanoromycetes
- Order: Lecanorales
- Family: Parmeliaceae
- Genus: Flavoparmelia
- Species: F. plicata

Binomial name
- Flavoparmelia plicata Aptroot & M.Cáceres (2014)

Species of lichen

Flavoparmelia plicata is a species of corticolous (bark-dwelling), foliose lichen in the family Parmeliaceae. Found in Brazil, it was formally described as a new species in 2014 by lichenologists André Aptroot and Marcela Cáceres. The type specimen was collected by the authors from the Parque Natural Municipal de Porto Velho (Rondônia), where it was found growing on the smooth bark of a tree near a rainforest. The lichen has a greyish-green thallus with a diameter of up to 10 cm (4 in). It contains usnic acid and protocetraric acid. The lichen shares many characteristics with the cosmopolitan species Flavoparmelia caperata, but differs from that species mainly in the form of its isidia.
