= Psiloparmelia salazinica =

Scientific classification
- Domain: Eukaryota
- Kingdom: Fungi
- Division: Ascomycota
- Class: Lecanoromycetes
- Order: Lecanorales
- Family: Parmeliaceae
- Genus: Psiloparmelia
- Species: P. salazinica

Binomial name
- Psiloparmelia salazinica Elix & T.H.Nash (1992)

Species of lichen

Psiloparmelia salazinica is a species of foliose lichen in the family Parmeliaceae. It is found in South America.

== Taxonomy ==
The lichen was described as a new species in 1992 by lichenologists John Elix and Tom Nash. The type specimen was collected by Nash from the east slope of the Sierra de Santa Victoria (Jujuy Province, Argentina) at an elevation of 4,400 m (14,400 ft). The species has also been recorded from Chile. The specific epithet refers to the presence of salazinic acid, a secondary compound that helps to distinguish it from a similar species, Psiloparmelia distincta.

== Description ==
The yellowish-green thallus of Psiloparmelia salazinica reaches diameters of 4–5 cm (1.6–2.0 in), comprising somewhat linear, irregularly branched, contiguously placed lobes measuring 0.8–2.0 mm wide. The lobes are dull, becoming pruinose near the tips. The apothecia measure 2–5 mm (0.08–0.2 in) in diameter; the ascospores are roughly spherical to elliptical in shape, measuring 4.5–5.5 by 7–9 μm. Pycnidia are common in this lichen; they are immersed in the surface of the thallus, and produce bifusiform conidia (i.e., rod-shaped with minute swellings at each end) measuring 0.5 by 5–6 μm.

Secondary chemicals that occur in this species are usnic acid (major), minor amounts of atranorin and salazinic acid, and minor to trace amounts of consalazinic acid, norstictic acid, and protocetraric acid. The expected results of standard chemical spot tests are: cortex K+ (yellow-pale red), C−, PD+ (yellow-orange), while in the medulla they are K−, C−, KC−, and PD−.
