= Pseudoparmelia kalbiana =

Scientific classification
- Domain: Eukaryota
- Kingdom: Fungi
- Division: Ascomycota
- Class: Lecanoromycetes
- Order: Lecanorales
- Family: Parmeliaceae
- Genus: Pseudoparmelia
- Species: P. kalbiana

Binomial name
- Pseudoparmelia kalbiana Elix & T.H.Nash (1998)

Species of lichen

Pseudoparmelia kalbiana is a species of foliose lichen in the family Parmeliaceae. It is found in South America.

== Taxonomy ==
The lichen was described as a new species in 1998 by lichenologists John Alan Elix and Thomas Hawkes Nash III. The type specimen was collected by Nash along highway route 70 in Goiás. It is named to honour Klaus Kalb, "who has collected widely in Brazil and has been a major contributor to our knowledge of tropical lichens".

== Description ==
The lichen has a leafy (foliose) thallus, pale to yellow-gray in colour (older individuals are browner), measuring 5–10 cm (2.0–3.9 in) wide with crowded, overlapping lobes 2–7 mm wide. It has a wrinkled, tan to brown lower surface and brown rhizines that serve as holdfasts to attach it to its substrate. The apothecia (reproductive organs) are common in this species; they are 2–3 mm wide with a concave, red-brown to dark brown disc. Its ascospores are ellipsoid and measure 9–12 by 7–8 μm. Its conidia (asexual spores) are bifusiform (i.e., threadlike with a swelling at both ends), measuring 6–10 by 0.7–1.0 μm.

Pseudoparmelia kalbiana contains secalonic acid as a major secondary chemical in the cortex with atranorin and chloroatranorin as minor metabolites. The medulla contains secalonic acid A and hypostictic acid as major metabolites and hyposalazinic acid as a minor component.

== Habitat and distribution ==
Pseudoparmelia kalbiana is usually found growing on trees, rarely on rocks. The lichen has been recorded at elevations between 100 and 1,000 m (330 and 3,280 ft). It has been reported from Brazil and Venezuela.
