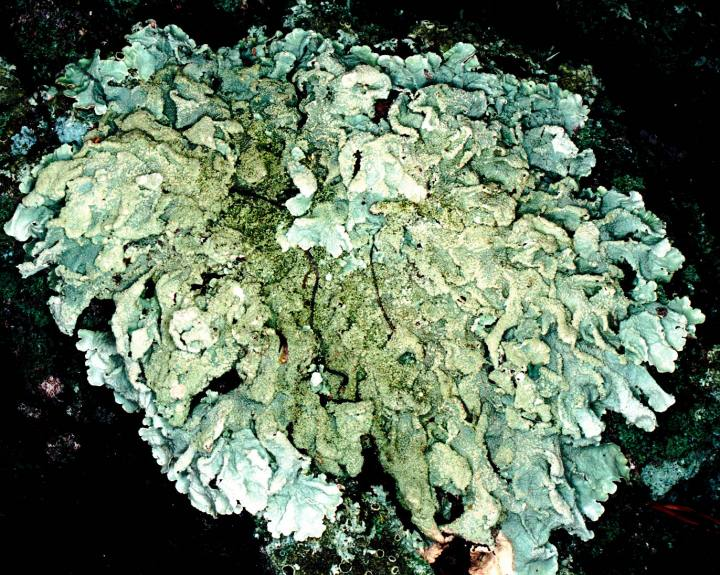

Conservation status
- Least Concern (IUCN 3.1)

- Secure (NatureServe)

Scientific classification
- Kingdom: Fungi
- Division: Ascomycota
- Class: Lecanoromycetes
- Order: Lecanorales
- Family: Parmeliaceae
- Genus: Flavoparmelia
- Species: F. baltimorensis

Binomial name
- Flavoparmelia baltimorensis (Gyeln. & Fóriss) Hale (1986)

Synonyms
- Parmelia baltimorensis Gyeln. & Fóriss (1931)

= Flavoparmelia baltimorensis =

Rock greenshield lichen

Species of fungus

Flavoparmelia baltimorensis, the rock greenshield lichen (from Lichens of North America), is a medium to large foliose lichen with a yellow green upper thallus surface when dry; its lobes are rounded without pseudocyphellae; and the upper surface is covered with globose, pustule-like growths resembling isidia. The lower surface is black with a narrow brown zone at the margins.

== Chemistry ==
Cortex, PD−, K−, KC+ yellowish, C− (usnic acid).
Medulla, PD+ red-orange, K−, KC+ pink, C− (protocetraric acid, with or without gyrophoric acid).

== Habitat ==
On rock in shaded or exposed areas.

== Similar species ==
The very similar Flavoparmelia caperata usually grows on the bark of trees, but may be found on rock. The granular soredia produced in irregular soralia distinguishes it from F. baltimorensis, which lacks true soredia.

Flavopunctelia flaventior and Flavopunctelia soredica have pseudocyphellae in the upper surface of the thallus, and the medulla is C+ red.

== Lichen checklists containing Flavoparmelia baltimorensis ==
- A cumulative checklist for the lichen-forming, lichenicolous and allied fungi of the continental United States and Canada. North Dakota State University.

== Gallery ==
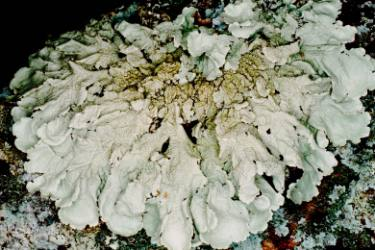
Flavoparmelia baltimorensis
