= Flavoparmelia virensica =

Scientific classification
- Domain: Eukaryota
- Kingdom: Fungi
- Division: Ascomycota
- Class: Lecanoromycetes
- Order: Lecanorales
- Family: Parmeliaceae
- Genus: Flavoparmelia
- Species: F. virensica

Binomial name
- Flavoparmelia virensica Elix, O.Blanco & A.Crespo (2010)

Species of lichen

Flavoparmelia virensica is a species of corticolous (bark-dwelling), foliose lichen found in Western Australia, newly described in 2010. This species, belonging to the large family Parmeliaceae, is similar in appearance to Flavoparmelia rutidota and F. caperatula, but can be distinguished by its spindle-shaped conidia and significant quantities of virensic acid. The lichen grows on dead and burnt wood as well as the bark of trees from the genera Allocasuarina, Acacia, and Hakea.

== Taxonomy ==
Flavoparmelia virensica was formally described as a new species in 2010 by lichenologists John Elix, Oscar Blanco, and Ana Crespo. The type specimen was collected by the first author from a lookout between Koolyanobbing township and Dowd Hill in Western Australia. The specific epithet virensica is derived from the Latin word virens ("green"), and refers to the presence of substantial quantities of virensic acid in the lichen.

Molecular phylogeny and historical biogeography analysis of genus Flavoparmelia suggests that Flavoparmelia virensica diverged genetically from its previous ancestor about 2 million years ago.

== Description ==
Flavoparmelia virensica has a yellow-green upper thallus surface and a black lower surface. It can grow up to 6 cm (2.4 in) wide and has laterally imbricate lobes that are irregularly branched, with more or less rotund tips. The thallus lacks soredia, dactyls, pustules, and isidia, and has sparse, simple rhizines. The apothecia are scattered over the thallus surface, measuring 1–4 mm wide. they have a concave then undulate-distorted disc that is cinnamon-brown to dark brown. The ascospores are ellipsoidal and measure 14–16 by 7–8 μm. The conidia are fusiform, and measure 8–9 by 1 μm.

== Habitat and distribution ==
Flavoparmelia virensica is sparsely distributed throughout the southwest region of Western Australia. It commonly grows on the bark of dead and burnt trees, as well as on the bark of Allocasuarina, Acacia, and Hakea trees. This species is often found in Eucalyptus woodland environments where ironstone rock outcrops and sandstone outcrops are present. It is known to coexist with various other lichen species including Buellia reagenella, B. tetrapla, Flavoparmelia caperatula, F. rutidota, Physcia jackii, Punctelia subalbicans, P. subflava, Ramalina inflata subsp. australis, Ramboldia brunneocarpa, Teloschistes chrysophthalmus, and Tephromela alectoronica.
