= Isolichenan =

Polysaccharide in certain lichens

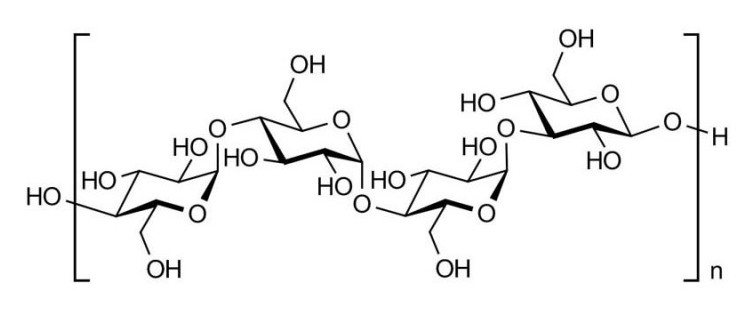

Names
- Other names Isolichenin; (1→3)&(1→4) α-D-glucan

Identifiers
CAS Number	53025-03-9
ChemSpider	none

Properties
Chemical formula	(C_{6}H_{10}O_{5})_{x}
Molar mass	Variable
- Except where otherwise noted, data are given for materials in their standard state (at 25 °C [77 °F], 100 kPa). Infobox references

Isolichenan, also known as isolichenin, is a cold-water-soluble α-glucan occurring in certain species of lichens. This lichen product was first isolated as a component of an extract of Iceland moss in 1813, along with lichenin. After further analysis and characterization of the individual components of the extract, isolichenan was named in 1881. It is the first α-glucan to be described from lichens. The presence of isolichenan in the cell walls is a defining characteristic in several genera of the lichen family Parmeliaceae. Although most prevalent in that family, it has also been isolated from members of the families Ramalinaceae, Stereocaulaceae, Roccellaceae, and Cladoniaceae. Experimental studies have shown that isolichenan is produced only when the two lichen components – fungus and alga – are growing together, not when grown separately. The biological function of isolichenan in the lichen thallus is unknown.

== Early studies ==
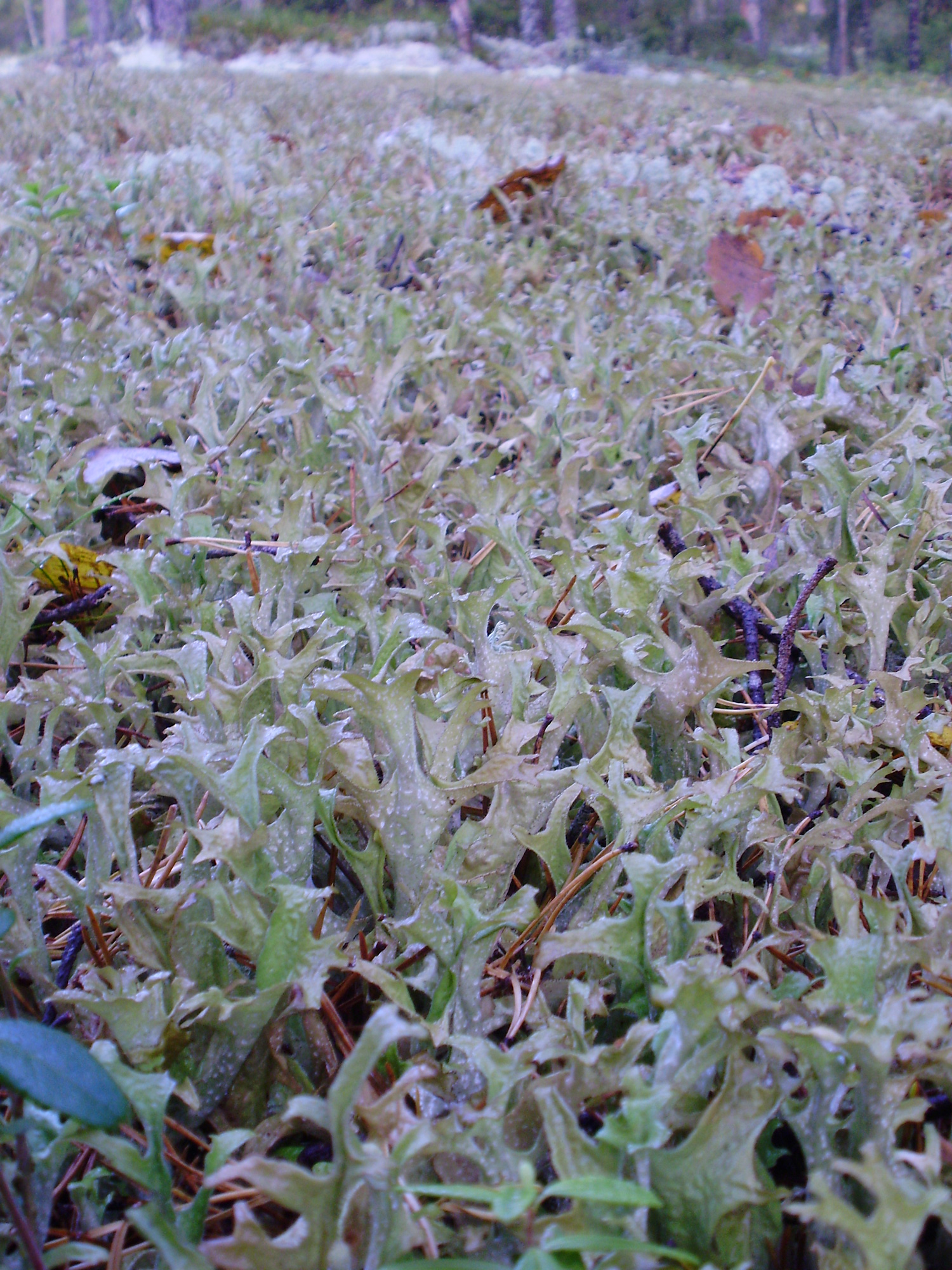
Cetraria islandica, seen here growing in a Swedish forest, is the lichen species from which isolichenan was first isolated.

Isolichenan was first isolated from Cetraria islandica in 1813 by Swedish chemist Jöns Jacob Berzelius, who also at the same time isolated the cellulose-like hot-water-soluble glucan lichenan. Because in these experiments the isolichenan component of the lichen extract had a positive reaction with iodine staining (i.e. production of a blue colour), Berzelius thought it to be similar in nature to starch, and he called it "lichen starch". It was thought to function as a reserve food source for the organism. Later studies showed it to be a mixture of polysaccharides. In 1838, Gerardus Johannes Mulder isolated the blue-staining component of the C. islandica extract, believing it to be starch. Friedrich Konrad Beilstein gave the name "isolichenan" to this substance in 1881. Isolichenan was the first α-glucan described from lichens.

In 1947, Kurt Heinrich Meyer and P. Gürtler, discussing the preparation of lichenan, reported that the mother liquor contained a water-soluble glucan that could be purified by repeated freezing and thawing. In this process, which completely removed lichenan, they obtained isolichenan in a 0.55% yield.

== Structure ==
Isolichenan is a polymer of glucose units joined by a mixture of α-(1→3) and α-(1→4) linkages. Using the technique of partial acid hydrolysis, Stanley Peat and colleagues determined that the linkages are of the α-configuration. The ratio of these linkages has been reported differently by various authors in the scientific literature: 11:9, 3:2, 2:1, 3:1, and 4:1. Fleming and Manners found the ratio to be 56.5:43.5 and 57:43 in two separate experiments using the Smith degradation procedure. This technique uses the successive steps of periodate oxidation, borohydride reduction, and mild acid hydrolysis; in this way, acetal linkages become hydrolysed, but glucosidic linkages are not. The distribution of linkages in isolichenan was found to be somewhat irregular, with both types occurring in groups of two or more in at least some areas. Another study suggests that isolichenan has mostly groups of one or two α-(1→3) bonds surrounded by α-(1→4) bonds. Compared with, for example, amylose (a linear α-(1→4)-linked glucan and the major component of starch), isolichenan has a relatively weak iodine-staining reaction. This weak staining intensity is thought to be a result of its preponderance of (1→3) linkages, a property that reduces the formation of the polyiodide-complex that gives the positive reaction its blue colour.

The chain length of isolichenan was estimated at 42–44 glucose units. The reported molecular weight of isolichenan also varies, from 26 kD to 2000 kD. The relatively short chain length of isolichenan may explain why it is soluble in cold water after it has been extracted from the lichen thallus. Purified isolichenan has a high positive specific rotation in water. It has been reported as high as +272, although different sources give differing values.

The term "isolichenan-type" has been used as a general term for α-D-glucans having (1→3)-(1→4) linkages in their main chain. Similar to isolichenan, the α-D-glucan known as Ci-3 consists of 1→3 and 1→4 linked α-D-glucose residues in ratio of 2:1, but with a much higher degree of polymerization and a molecular weight of about 2000 kD. It is also found in Cetraria islandica. As the discrepancies in reported values demonstrate, lichens produce isolichenan-type polysaccharides with considerable variation in linkage ratios as well as molecular weight, even within the same species.

The carbon-13 nuclear magnetic resonance spectrum of isolichenan was reported by Yokota and colleagues in 1979 and also by Gorin and Iacomini in 1984.

== Occurrence ==
Since its discovery in Cetraria islandica, isolichenan has been isolated from many other lichen species. It is predominant in the Parmeliaceae, a large and diverse family of the class Lecanoromycetes. Parmeliaceae genera and species containing isolichenan include: Alectoria (A. sulcata, A. sarmentosa); Cetraria (Cetraria cucullata, C. islandica, C. nivaris, C. richardsonii; Evernia (E. prunastri); Letharia (L. vulpina); Neuropogon (N. aurantiaco-ater); Parmelia (P. caperata, P. cetrarioides, P. conspersa, P. hypotrypella, P. laevior, P. nikkoensis, P. saxatilis, P. tinctorum); Parmotrema (P. cetrarum, P. araucaria, P. sulcata); and Usnea (U. barbata, U. baylei, U. faciata, U. longissima, U. meridionalis, U. rubescens). A few members of the family Ramalinaceae have been shown to contain isolichenan, including Ramalina celastri, R. ecklonii, R. scopulorum, and R. usnea. In the family Stereocaulaceae, isolichenan has been isolated from S. excutum, S. japonicum, and S. sorediiferum. It is also known to occur in single species in the Roccellaceae (Roccella montagnei) and the Cladoniaceae (Pilophorus acicularis).

== Uses ==
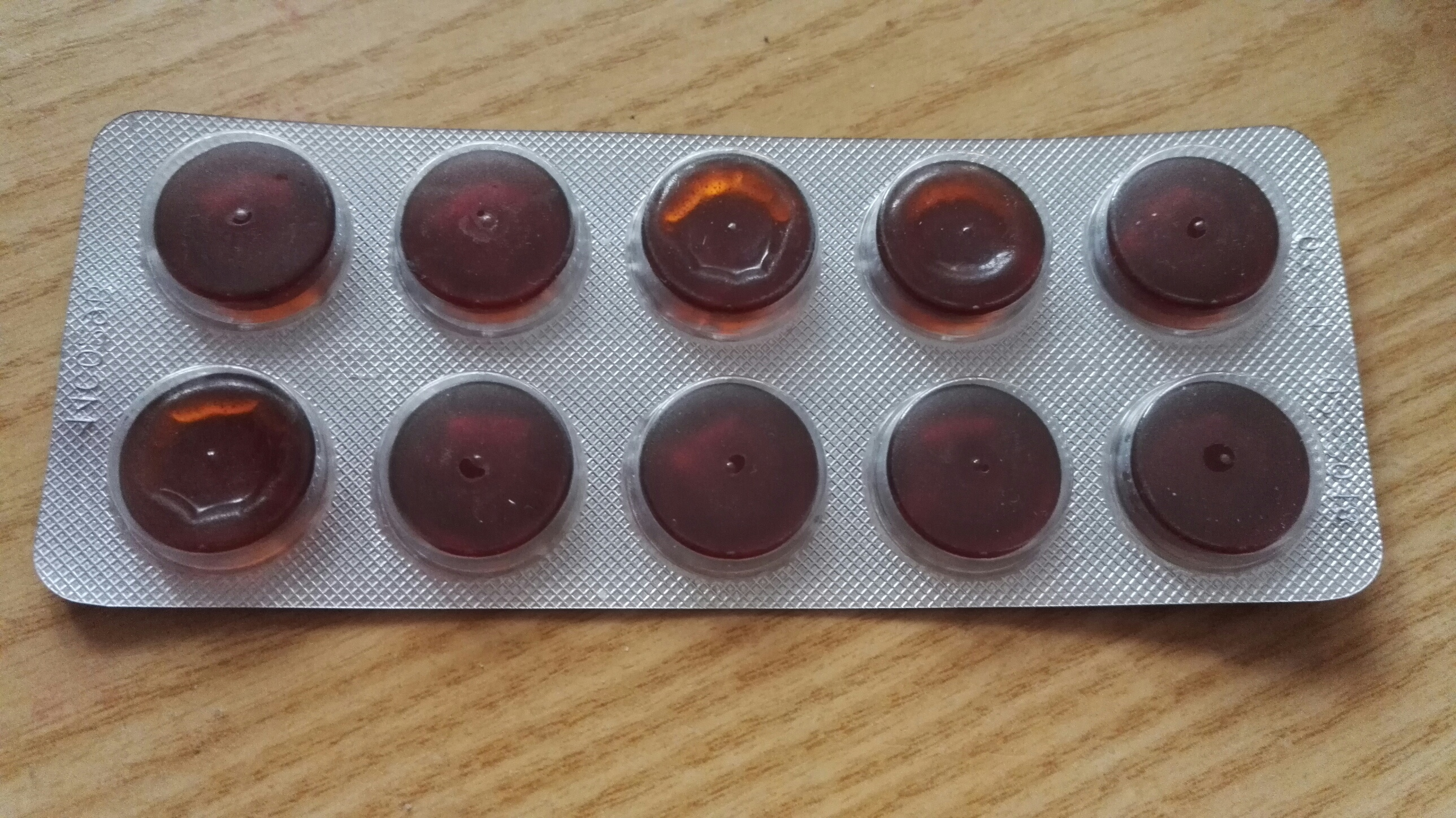
A blister pack with cough lozenges containing Cetraria islandica extract

Although isolichenan is not nearly as constant at the genus level as lichenan, the presence of isolichenan in the cell walls is a defining character in several genera of the lichen family Parmeliaceae, including Asahinea, Cetrelia, Flavoparmelia, and Psiloparmelia. In contrast, the absence of isolichenan is a character of genus Xanthoparmelia.

Isolichenan is used as an active ingredient in cough lozenges as a component of Cetraria islandica extract.

== Research ==
Isolichenan was shown to enhance hippocampal plasticity and behavioural performance in rats. When administered orally, isolichenan was also shown to improve memory acquisition in mice impaired by ethanol, as well as in rats in which memory impairment had been induced by beta-amyloid peptide. In more recent research, isolichenan was shown to improve cognitive function in healthy adults.

The main α-glucan synthesized by lichens of the genus Ramalina in the symbiotic state is isolichenan. A series of experiments have shown, however, that it is not produced by either individual symbiont when cultivated apart from each other. Its absence in this circumstance suggests that it may not have an importance as a structural part of the fungal cell wall; this contrasts with lichenan, where the (1→3)(1→4)-β-glucan has been shown to be involved in cell wall structure. Isolichenan is synthesized by the mycobiont only in the presence of its symbiotic partner (the green alga Trebouxia) in a special microenvironment – the lichen thallus. The triggering of this phenomenon and the biological function of isolichenan in the symbiotic relationship between fungi and algae is still unknown. In a study on the immunomodulatory effects of an aqueous Cetraria islandica extract, it was shown that the extract was able to upregulate the secretion of the cytokine interleukin 10. However, when the individual components of this extract (including lichenan, isolichenan, protolichesterinic and fumarprotocetraric acids) were tested with the same assay, isolichenan had no anti-inflammatory effects (only lichenan did).

== Citations ==
=== Cited literature ===
- Common, Ralph S. (1991). "The distribution and taxonomic significance of lichenan and isolichenan in the Parmeliaceae (lichenized Ascomycotina), as determined by iodine reactions. I. Introduction and methods. II. The genus Alectoria and associated taxa". Mycotaxon. 41 (1): 67–112.
- Thell, Arne; Crespo, Ana; Divakar, Pradeep K.; Kärnefelt, Ingvar; Leavitt, Steven D.; Lumbsch, H. Thorsten; Seaward, Mark R.D. (2012). "A review of the lichen family Parmeliaceae – history, phylogeny and current taxonomy". Nordic Journal of Botany. 30 (6): 641–664. doi:10.1111/j.1756-1051.2012.00008.x.
