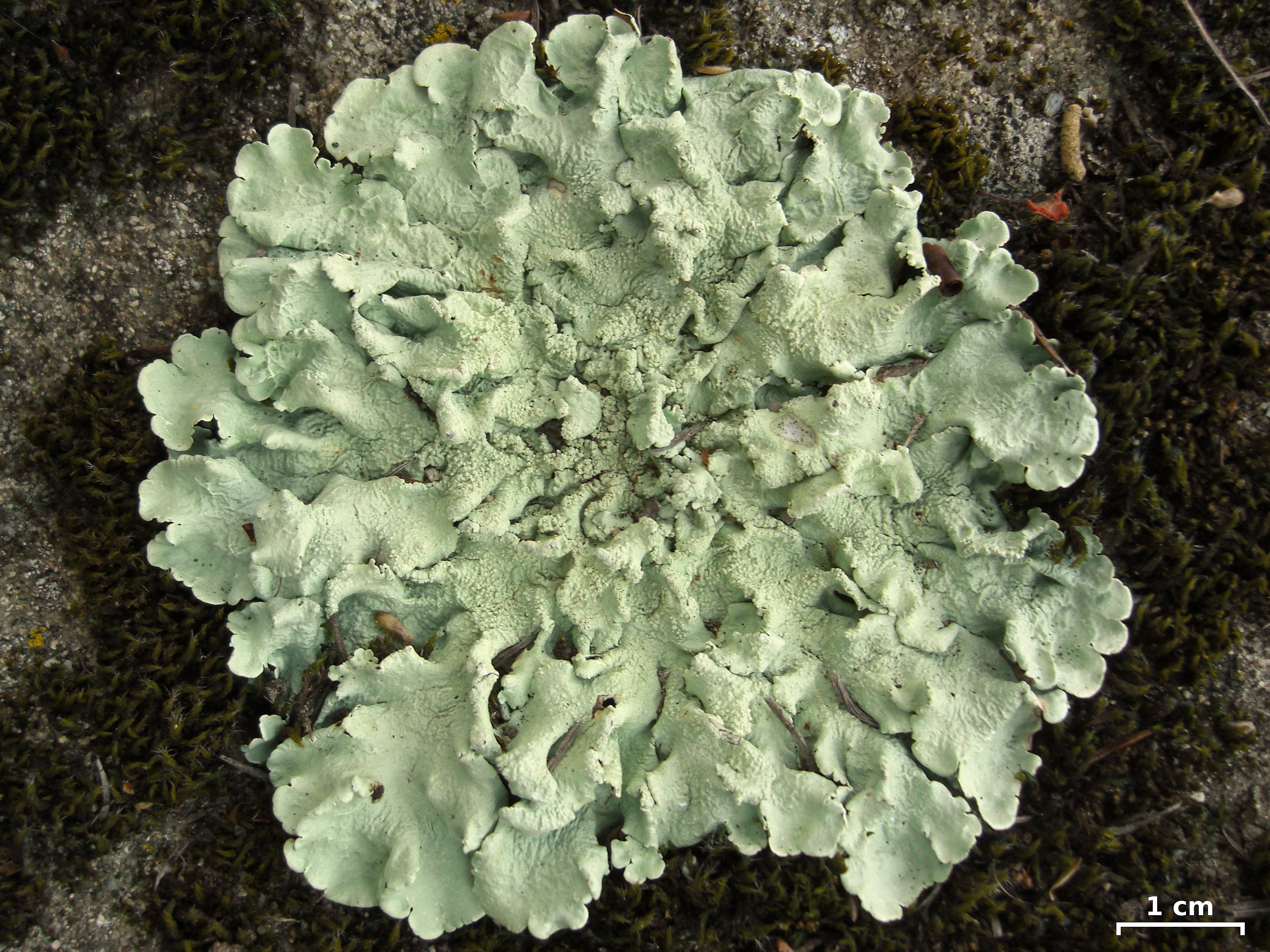
- Flavoparmelia caperata

Scientific classification
- Domain: Eukaryota
- Kingdom: Fungi
- Division: Ascomycota
- Class: Lecanoromycetes
- Order: Lecanorales
- Family: Parmeliaceae
- Genus: Flavoparmelia; Hale (1986)

Type species
- Flavoparmelia caperata (L.) Hale (1986)

= Flavoparmelia =

Genus of fungi

Flavoparmelia is a genus of foliose lichens in the family Parmeliaceae. Because of their appearance, they are commonly known as greenshield lichens. The widely distributed genus contains about 40 species.

== Taxonomy ==
The genus was circumscribed by the American lichenologist Mason Hale in 1986 to contain 17 former Pseudoparmelia species with broad lobes, usnic acid in the cortex, and isolichenan in the cell walls.

== Description ==
Flavoparmelia lichens are medium-sized foliose lichens that are yellow-green in colour, with a thallus comprising rounded lobed that measure 2–8 mm wide, which form flat and loosely attached patches that are 6–20 cm (2.4–7.9 in) wide. Older parts of the upper thallus surface are wrinkled, while the newer parts are smooth. There is a black lower surface with simple, unbranched rhizines, and a distinct bare zone around the margin. The photobiont partner is green algae from genus Trebouxia. Flavoparmelia has larger spores than other segregate genera of Pseudoparmelia.

== Biogeography ==
The distributional ranges of Flavoparmelia species have been shaped by both long-distance dispersal and vicariance. A 2013 study identified more geographical structure within Flavoparmelia than previously recognized, with some species having wider distributions than others. The authors suggest that phenotypical species delimitation often underestimates true diversity. Flavoparmelia originated in southern South America, and its major radiation began in the late Oligocene. The splits in the genus occurred at different times, shaping the diversity of the main lineages within the genus. The South American ancestor of Flavoparmelia originated before the separation of southern South America and Australia from Antarctica, suggesting that vicariance could have played a role in shaping this distribution. Recent diversification in Australia resulted from recent diversification at the Miocene-Pliocene boundary. Group 3 (a cluster of Flavoparmelia species that have wider distributions, such as the subcosmopolitan F. soredians) is estimated to have originated in the Cape Region of South Africa during the late Miocene. Long-distance dispersal can account for the current distribution of some species, while evidence for vicariance has also been shown in Parmeliaceae.

== Species ==
In The 2024 Outline of Fungi and fungus-like taxa, there are estimated to be 39 Flavoparmelia species.

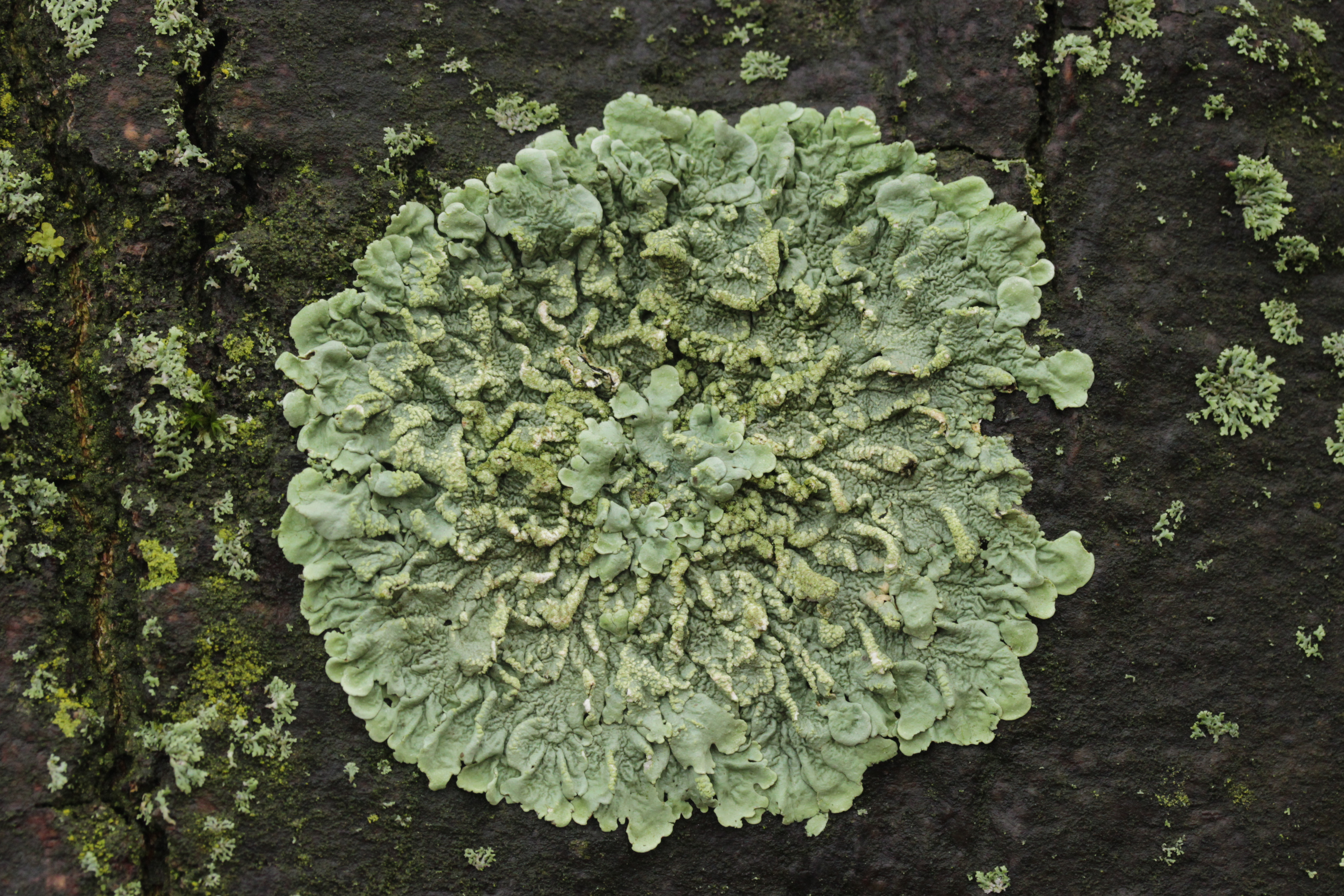
Flavoparmelia soredians

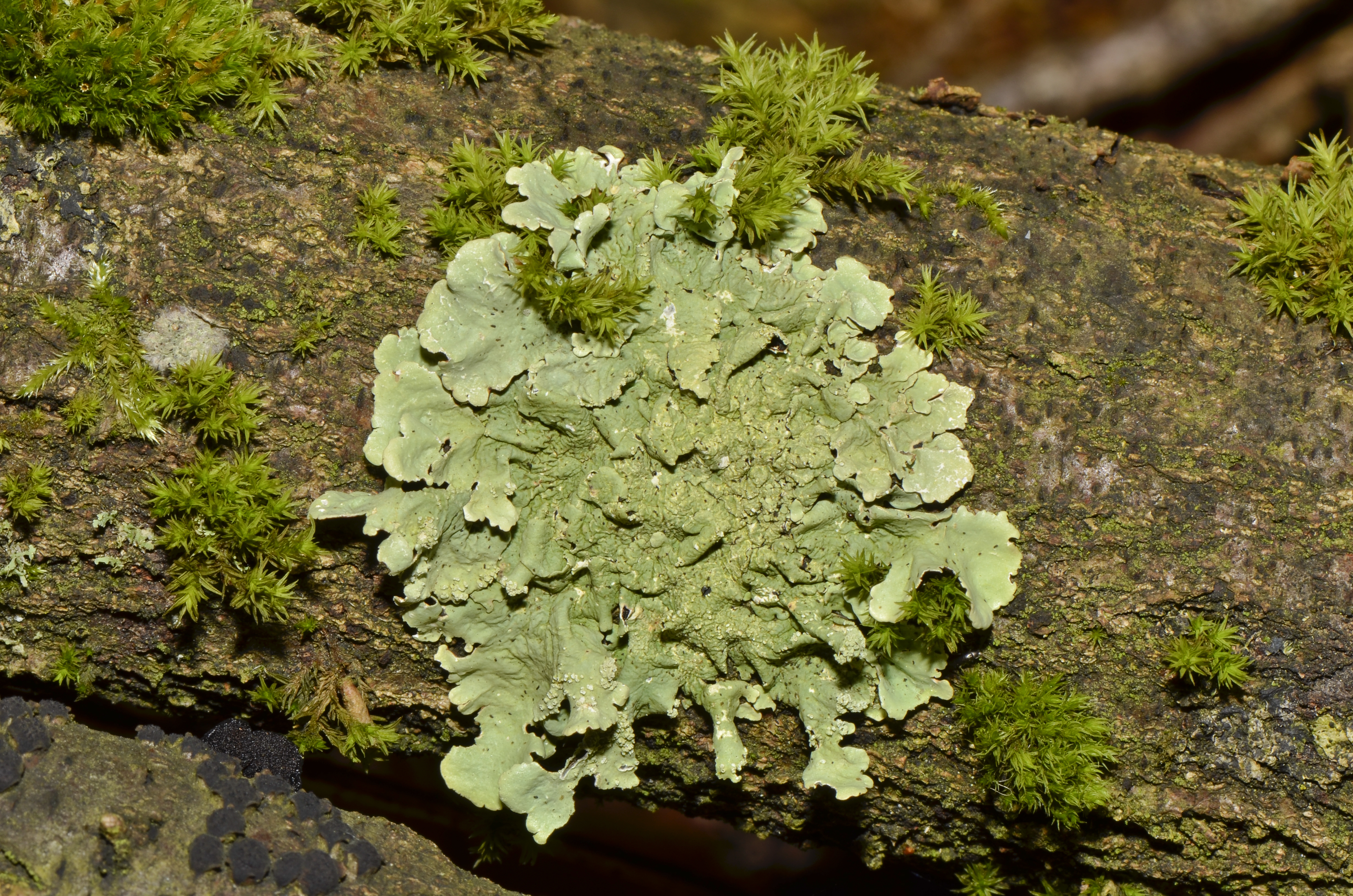
Flavoparmelia caperata

- Flavoparmelia baltimorensis (Gyeln. & Fóriss) Hale (1986) – North America
- Flavoparmelia caperata (L.) Hale (1986) – widespread
- Flavoparmelia caperatula (Nyl.) Elix, O.Blanco & A.Crespo (2010)
- Flavoparmelia citrinescens (Gyeln.) O.Blanco, A.Crespo & Elix (2010) – South America
- Flavoparmelia diffractaica Elix & J.Johnst. (1988)
- Flavoparmelia ecuadorensis T.H.Nash, Elix & J.Johnst. (1987) – Ecuador
- Flavoparmelia euplecta (Stirt.) Hale (1986) – Australia
- Flavoparmelia ferax (Müll.Arg.) Hale (1986)
- Flavoparmelia haysomii (C.W.Dodge) Hale (1986) – Australia
- Flavoparmelia haywardiana Elix & J.Johnst. (1988) – Australia
- Flavoparmelia helmsii (Kurok. & Filson) Hale (1986)
- Flavoparmelia kantvilasii Elix (1993) – New South Wales
- Flavoparmelia marchantii Elix, O.Blanco & A.Crespo (2005) – Australia
- Flavoparmelia norfolkensis Elix & Streimann (1989) – Norfolk Island
- Flavoparmelia plicata Aptroot & M.Cáceres (2014) – Brazil
- Flavoparmelia proeuplecta Elix & J.Johnst. (1988)
- Flavoparmelia rutidota (Hook.f. & Taylor) Hale (1986) – Australia; North America
- Flavoparmelia scabrosina Elix & J.Johnst. (1988)
- Flavoparmelia secalonica Elix & J.Johnst. (1988)
- Flavoparmelia soredians (Nyl.) Hale (1986) – widespread
- Flavoparmelia springtonensis (Elix) Hale (1986)
- Flavoparmelia subambigua (Hale) O.Blanco, A.Crespo & Elix (2010) – South America
- Flavoparmelia subcapitata (Nyl. ex Hasse) Hale ex DePriest & B.W.Hale (1998) – North America
- Flavoparmelia succinprotocetrarica Elix & J.Johnst. (1988)
- Flavoparmelia virensica Elix, O.Blanco & A.Crespo (2010)

== Ecology ==
A new genus and species of lichenicolous fungus, Knudsenia flavoparmeliarum, was found growing on the thalli of Flavoparmelia caperata and F. flaventior in subalpine and alpine regions of Central Himalaya.

== Biomonitoring ==
Some studies have investigated the potential of using Flavoplaca caperata as a biomonitor of air pollution.
