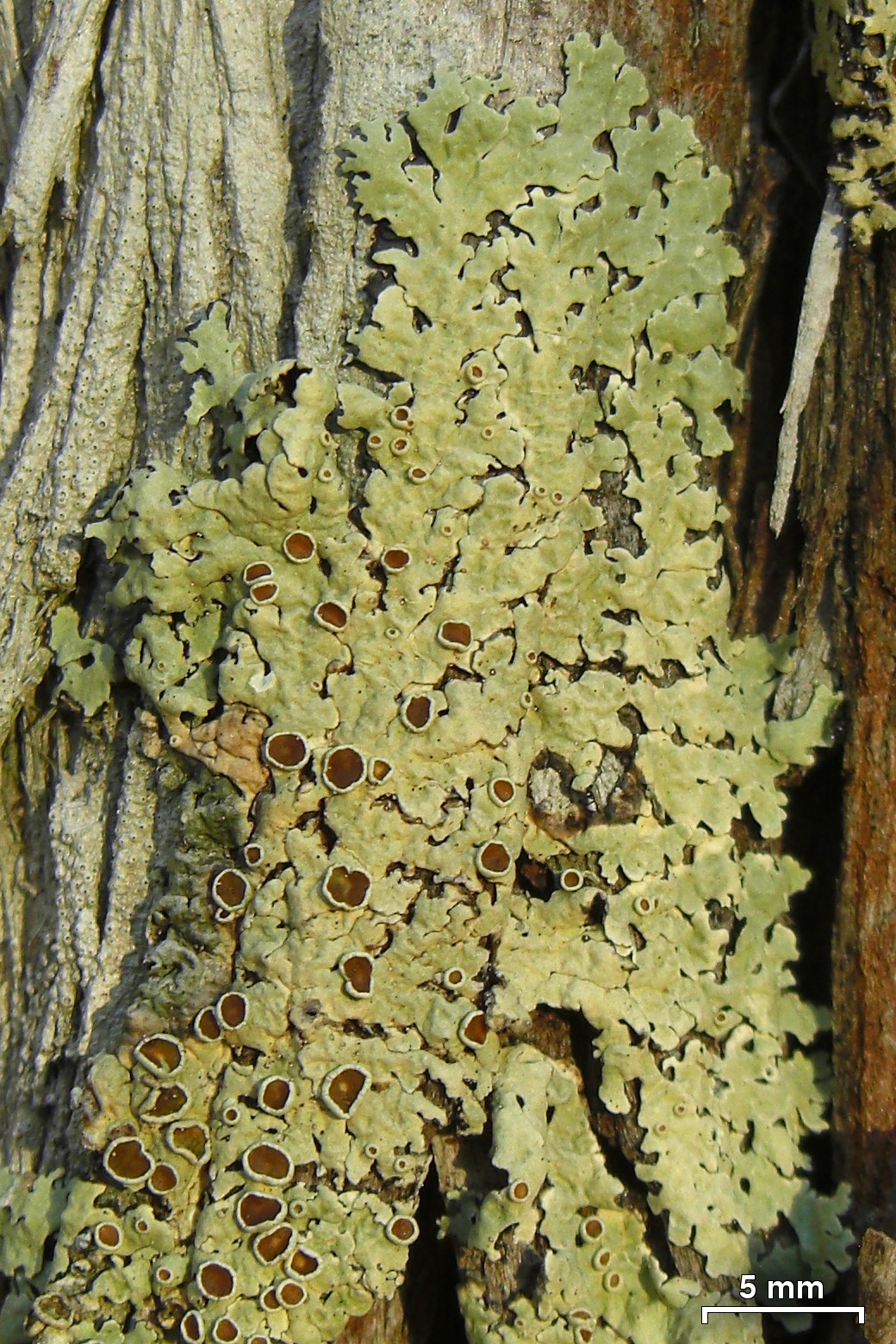
- Pseudoparmelia uleana

Scientific classification
- Domain: Eukaryota
- Kingdom: Fungi
- Division: Ascomycota
- Class: Lecanoromycetes
- Order: Lecanorales
- Family: Parmeliaceae
- Genus: Pseudoparmelia; Lynge (1914)

Type species
- Pseudoparmelia cyphellata Lynge (1914)

= Pseudoparmelia =

Genus of lichens

Pseudoparmelia is a genus of lichen-forming fungi in the family Parmeliaceae. The genus has a pantropical distribution.

== Taxonomy ==
It was circumscribed by Bernt Arne Lynge in 1914, who distinguished the genus from Parmelia by the presence of pseudocyphellae on the underside of the lichen thallus. However, this distinguishing characteristic was later shown to be an artifact caused by torn rhizines.

The genus was not widely accepted until it was redefined by Mason Hale in the 1970s to include parmelioid lichens with a pored epicortex and narrow, non-ciliate lobes. Further research revealed that this broader definition included a heterogeneous group of species, leading to a more restricted circumscription with most species being transferred to other genera.

Molecular phylogenetics studies have shown that Pseudoparmelia forms a distinct lineage within the Parmeliaceae, closely related to the genera Relicina and Relicinopsis. These three genera share features including a pored epicortex, isolichenan as cell wall polysaccharide, and relatively small ascospores. The genus has its centres of distribution in the Neotropics and southern Africa.

== Description ==
The main body (thallus) of Pseudoparmelia has a yellowish tint in both its outer layer (upper cortex) and inner tissue (medulla), caused by the presence of chemicals called secalonic acids. The upper surface has microscopic pores in its protective outer layer, known as a pored epicortex. The lobes of the thallus are narrow and lack hair-like projections called cilia.

On the thallus underside, Pseudoparmelia species have a pale surface with simple root-like structures (rhizines) that attach the lichen to its substrate. The fungal component of these lichens contains isolichenan in its cell walls, a type of polysaccharide that helps give the lichen structure. The cortex contains small amounts of the compound atranorin, while the medulla contains β-orcinol depsidones.

When reproducing, these lichens produce small, ellipsoid to nearly spherical ascospores. They also produce another type of reproductive cell called conidia, which are elongated and can be either bifusiform (tapering at both ends) or thread-like in shape.

Pseudoparmelia species are found primarily in two regions of the world: tropical and subtropical America (the Neotropics) and southern Africa. They can be distinguished from similar-looking genera by their unique combination of chemical compounds, particularly the presence of secalonic acids and absence of usnic acid, as well as their lack of specialised structures like bulbate cilia that are found in related genera. A unique chemical feature of the genus is the presence of terphenyl derivatives called butlerins, compounds that are uncommon in lichen-forming fungi but more frequently found in non-lichenised mushrooms and other basidiomycetes.

== Species ==
- Pseudoparmelia arida (Lynge) Elix & T.H.Nash (1998)
- Pseudoparmelia brakoana Elix & T.H.Nash (1998)
- Pseudoparmelia buckiana Elix & T.H.Nash (1998)
- Pseudoparmelia callichroa Kurok. (1976)
- Pseudoparmelia caribaea (Hale) Hale (1974)
- Pseudoparmelia chapadensis (Lynge) Hale (1974)
- Pseudoparmelia chlorea (Stizenb.) Krog & Swinscow (1987)
- Pseudoparmelia concomitans Hale (1976)
- Pseudoparmelia convexa Elix & T.H.Nash (1998)
- Pseudoparmelia cubensis (Nyl.) Elix & T.H.Nash (1998)
- Pseudoparmelia cyphellata Lynge (1914)
- Pseudoparmelia dahlii Hale (1976)
- Pseudoparmelia floridensis Elix & T.H.Nash (1998)
- Pseudoparmelia harrisiana Elix & T.H.Nash (1998)
- Pseudoparmelia hypomiltha (Fée) Hale (1974)
- Pseudoparmelia kalbiana Elix & T.H.Nash (1998)
- Pseudoparmelia regnellii (Lynge) Elix & T.H.Nash (1998)
- Pseudoparmelia relicinoides Elix & T.H.Nash (1998)
- Pseudoparmelia sphaerospora (Nyl.) Hale (1976)
- Pseudoparmelia uleana (Müll.Arg.) Elix & T.H.Nash (1998)
