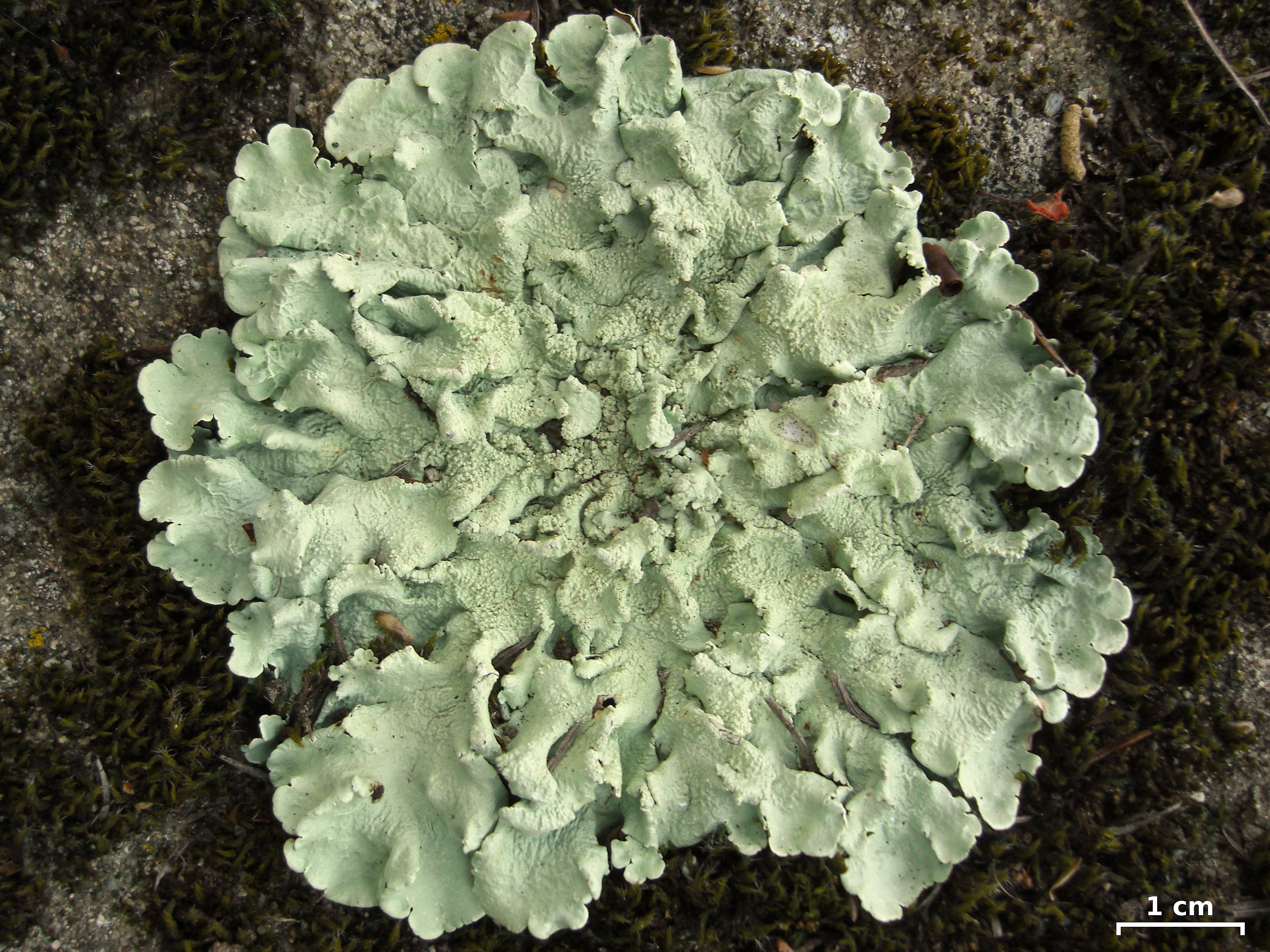

Conservation status
- Least Concern (IUCN 3.1)

- Secure (NatureServe)

Scientific classification
- Kingdom: Fungi
- Division: Ascomycota
- Class: Lecanoromycetes
- Order: Lecanorales
- Family: Parmeliaceae
- Genus: Flavoparmelia
- Species: F. caperata

Binomial name
- Flavoparmelia caperata (L.) Hale (1986)

Synonyms
- Lichen caperatus L. (1753); Platisma caperatum (L.) Hoffm. (1794); Lobaria caperata (L.) Hoffm. (1796); Parmelia caperata (L.) Ach. (1803); Imbricaria caperata (L.) DC. (1805); Parmotrema caperata (L.) M.Choisy (1952); Pseudoparmelia caperata (L.) Hale (1974)

= Flavoparmelia caperata =

Common greenshield lichen

Species of lichen-forming fungus

Flavoparmelia caperata, the common greenshield lichen, is a foliose lichen that grows on the bark of trees, and occasionally on rock.

== Identification ==
Flavoparmelia caperata is a medium to large foliose lichen that has a very distinctive pale yellow green upper cortex when dry. The rounded lobes, measuring 3–8 mm (0.1–0.3 in) wide, usually have patches of granular soredia arising from pustules. The lobes of the thallus may be smooth, but quite often have a wrinkled appearance especially in older specimens. The lower surface is black except for a brown margin; rhizoids attached to the lower surface are black and unbranched.

== Similar species ==
The very similar Flavoparmelia baltimorensis grows mainly on rock and has globose, pustular outgrowths (somewhat similar to isidia) on the upper surface of the lobes, but does not produce granular soredia. Other fungi that could be similar may belong in the genera Hypotrachyna and Hypogymnia.

== Habitat and distribution ==
In Nepal, Flavoparmelia caperata has been reported from 2,250 to 2,743 m elevation in a compilation of published records.

== See also ==
- List of lichens named by Carl Linnaeus
