= Jan Bystrek =

Polish botanist (1934–2020)

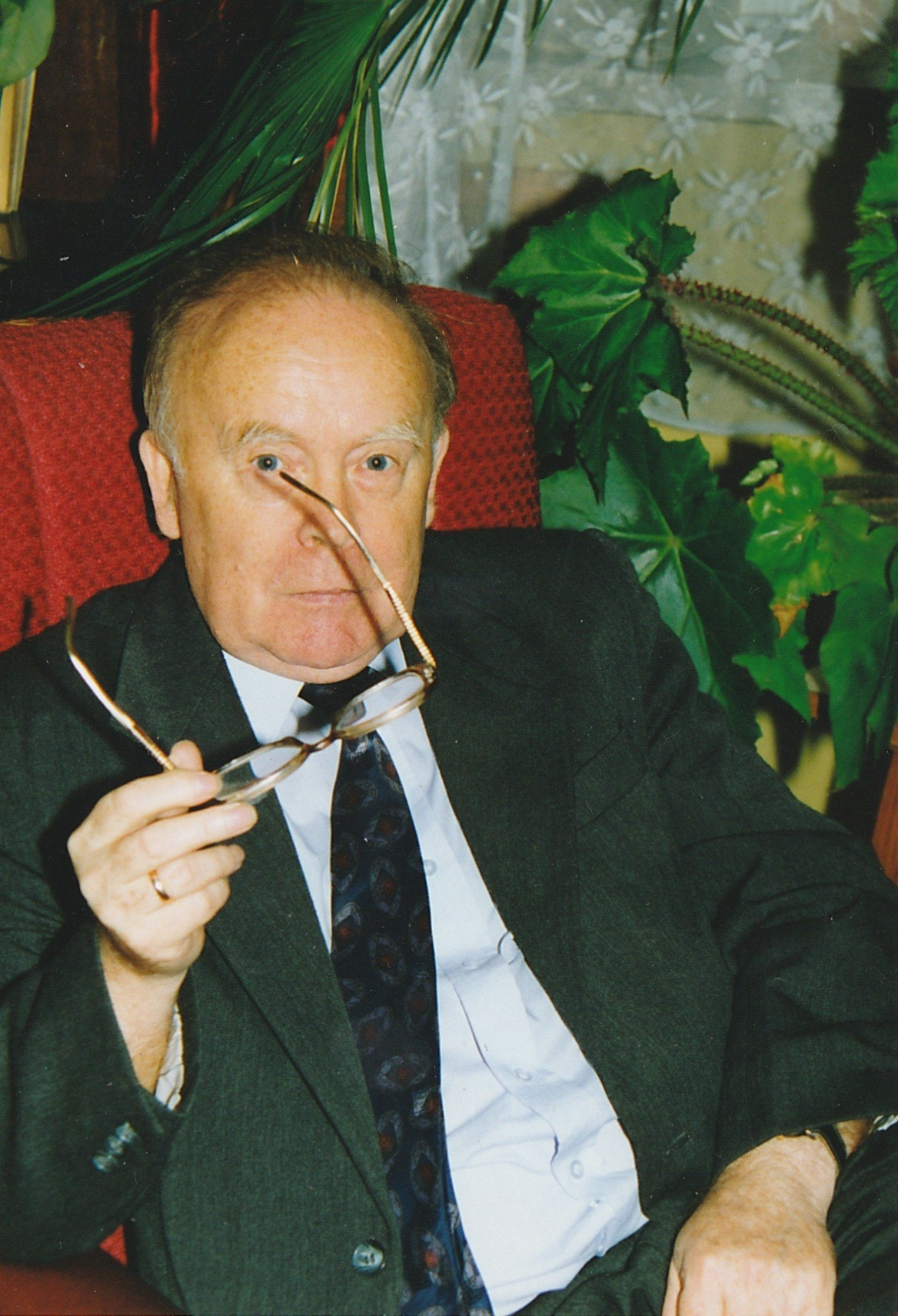
- Jan Bystrek in 2014
- Born: 17 June 1934; Grodzany, Poland
- Died: 20 February 2020 (aged 85)
- Scientific career
- Fields: Botany
- Institutions: Maria Curie-Skłodowska University
- Author abbrev. (botany): Bystrek

Jan Bystrek (17 June 1934 – 20 February 2020) was a Polish botanist and professor of natural sciences. He was employed at the Department of Systematic and Geography of Plants at the Maria Curie-Skłodowska University from 1956 until 2004. He published research in many fields, including botany, floristry, lichenology, systematics, environmental protection, biogeography, ecology, bioindication, and nature and landscape protection. He was involved in popularizing knowledge about nature and ecological education.

== Education ==
Jan Bystrek was born in Grodzany on 17 June 1934. In 1951 Bystrek graduated from the secondary school in Bychawa. After graduating from high school, he started studies in Kraków at the AGH University of Science and Technology, which he had to leave after two months for financial reasons. He started working at the Municipal self-help Cooperative in Bychawa. In the years 1952 to 1957 he studied at the Maria Curie-Skłodowska University (UMCS) in Lublin at the Faculty of Biology and Earth Sciences. He completed all level of academic promotion at this institution, including doctorate (1965), habilitation (1977), and Professor (1991).

== Career ==
From 1956 to 2004 Bystrek was an academic teacher at the Maria Curie-Skłodowska University in Lublin. In 1958 he became a senior assistant. He supplemented the teaching staff at the Evening Primary School for Working in Lublin. In 1965 he became an assistant professor at the Department of Systematics and Geography of Plants, and in 1977 he was habilitated. In 1991 he was awarded the title of Professor.

Bystrek was a co-author of the "Biology" postgraduate studies program and the head of these studies at the Faculty of Biology and Earth Sciences, UMCS (1980–2004). He also co-created postgraduate studies "Nature" in Lublin, Przemyśl, and Biłgoraj. From 1992 to 2005, he was the head of the Department of Botany (Institute of Biology) at the University of Bialystok. He was also an academic teacher at the branch of the University of Warsaw in Białystok (1986–1977), at the University of Białystok and at the School of Humanities and Natural Sciences in Sandomierz (1998–2000).

He was involved in popularizing knowledge about nature and ecological education. From 1965 he cooperated with Provincial Teachers' Training Centers in Lublin, where he gave lectures and chaired examination committees (from 1984 chairman of the 1st and 2nd degree specialization committee in Lublin, in 1995–1999 in Zamość). In the period 1997–2004 at the TWP, the Regional Center for Teacher Training and School Leadership conducted field classes with biology teachers: Polish National Parks and their role in ecological and environmental education. He also organized meetings with teachers and students of schools.

As an academic teacher, he conducted classes in plant morphology and systematics, biogeography, biological aspects of environmental protection, flower biology and flowering ecology, lichenology, mycology, and Polish geography. He also organized field activities in the following areas: Carpathians, Sudetes, the Baltic region, the Suwałki region, Warmia and Masuria, Białowieża Primeval Forest, Lublin region, and the Świętokrzyskie Mountains. He was a long-term tutor of the year, a member of the Examination Board for the first year of full-time and extramural studies and an examiner. From 1977, he was chairman of the University Social Commission of UMCS, head of the Sanitary and Medical Service of Civil Defense of UMCS, and chairman of the Assistant Hotel Committee.

He was a supervisor of 5 doctors, and conducted several reviews of the scientific achievements of candidates for the title of professor, habilitation doctor, doctor, as well as over 300 graduate students in full-time studies, extramural studies and postgraduate studies at the Maria Curie-Skłodowska University in Lublin and the University of Białystok. In 1978 Bystrek became one of the co-founders of the mycological and lichenological section of the Polskie Towarzystwo Botaniczne.

Jan Bystrek died on 20 February 2020.

== Scientific memberships ==
Bystrek was a member of several scientific and academic organisations, including the Scientific Council of the Institute of Botany of the Polish Academy of Sciences in Kraków, the Scientific Council of the Lublin branch of the Polish Academy of Sciences, the Lichenological Section of the Polish Academy of Sciences, the Regional Branch of TWP Lublin, and the Polish Teachers' Union.

== Awards and decorations ==
Several awards and distinctions were given to Bystrek to honour his contributions to science and society. These include: two awards from the Ministry of Science and Higher Education, several awards of the Maria Curie-Skłodowska University Rector, the Knight's Cross of the Order of Polonia Restituta, the Medal of the Commission of National Education; the Medal of Merit for National Defence, Merit for the University of Białystok, Merit for the Lublin Region, and City of Lublin Medal of Merit. He also received the Gold Badge of the Society of Universal Knowledge, and the Gold Badge of the Polish National Alliance.

== Personal ==
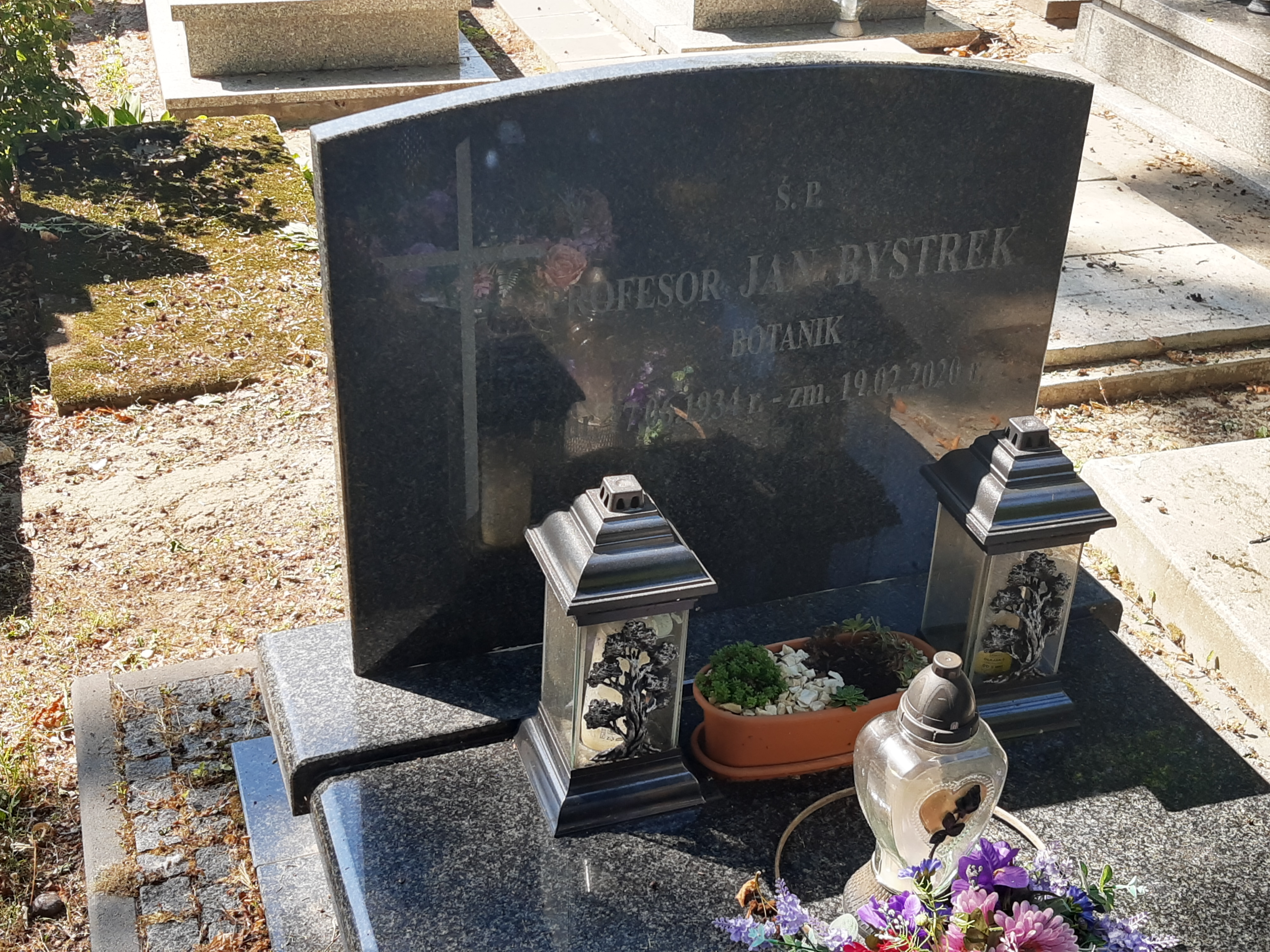
Bystrek's grave at the Lipowa Street cemetery in Lublin

His wife was Jolanta Teresa, who was a curator with a MA in biology. They had two children: Katarzyna, Master of Arts (MA) in political science and Polish studies and certified teacher, and Paweł, MA in economics. His colleague Beata Krzewicka, president of lichenology section of the Polish Botanical Society, expressed that she will remember Bystrek as "not only as a scientist with extensive knowledge and experience, but also as an exceptionally kind, open, helpful and straightforward man".

== Publications ==
Bystrek wrote 120 publications, two books on lichens, entries on lichens in the 34-volume PWN Encyclopedia, as well as 80 original scientific treatises on lichen taxonomy, with a focus on the families Cladoniaceae, Parmeliaceae, Ramalinaceae, and Usneaceae. He circumscribed the lichen genus Sulcaria, and described several dozen species new to science. Examples include Bryoria poeltii, Bryoria perspinosa, Bryoria variabilis, Bryoria forsteri, Bryoria fabiszewskiana, Bryoria brodoana, Usnea pewleticzii, Ramalina motykana, as well as many other taxa of different ranks (sections, subspecies, varieties), as well as new combinations.

In his publications, he included, inter alia, taxonomic corrections of the genus Alectoria. He compiled regional monographs of the genera Alectoria (for the Tatra Mountains and the Świętokrzyskie Mountains in the Lublin region), Ramalina, Peltigera, Parmelia (Lublin region), Bryoria (Ukrainian Carpathians), and Usnea. In his publications, he also dealt with the topics of lichen ecology, the use of lichens as bioindicators, and air pollution.

Bystrek documented lichen biota in many Polish national parks: Tatrzański National Park, Białowieski National Park, Roztoczański National Park, Wigierski National Park, Świętokrzyski National Park, Polesie National Park, and Biebrza National Park, in addition to nature reserves and protected landscape areas; he pioneered floristic and ecological research, often published in co-authorship with other researchers. Bystrek published articles on lichens in regional monographs, such as for Roztoczański National Park, Poleski National Park, and the Natural Environment of the Lublin Region.

=== Books ===
- Bystrek, Jan (1972). Zarys lichenologii [Introduction to Lichenology] (in Polish). Warsaw: Polish Scientific Publishers PWN. pp. 1–251.
- Bystrek, Jan (1997). Podstawy lichenologii [Fundamentals of Lichenology] (in Polish). Lublin: Wydaw. Uniwersytetu Marii Curie-Skołodowskiej. pp. 1–312.

=== Original research ===
- Bystrek, Jan (1971). "Taxonomic studies of the genus Alectoria". Annales Universitatis Mariae Curie-Sklodowska, Sectio C – Biologia. 26: 265–279.
- Bystrek, J. (1969). "Die Gattung Alectoria. Lichenes, Usneaceae (Flechten des Himalaya 5)". Khumbu Himal (in German). 6: 17–24.
- Bystrek, J.; Górzyńska, K. (1985). "Espèces de la section Glabratae (genus Usnea Wigg. ex Ach.) en Europe". Annales Universitatis Mariae Curie-Sklodowska, Sectio C – Biologia (in French). 40: 175–191.
- Bystrek, Jan; Karczmarz, Kazimierz (1988). "Epifityczna flora i jej zanikanie pod wpływem zanieczyszczeń powietrza. Strefy skażeń środowiska w woj. chełmskim na podstawie licheno i brioindykacji" [Epiphytic flora and its extinction through air pollution. Contamination zones in the Chełm Voivodship based on lichen- and bryoindication]. Annales Universitatis Mariae Curie-Sklodowska, Sectio C – Biologia (in Polish). 43 (14): 185–213.
- Bystrek, Jan (1994). Studien über die Flechtengattungen Usnea in Europa [Studies on the lichen genus Usnea in Europe] (in German). Wydawnictwo Uniwersytetu Marii Curie-Sklodowskiea. pp. 1–69.
- Bystrek, Jan; Fabiszewski, Jerzy (2014). "Materials to North American lichen flora". Acta Societatis Botanicorum Poloniae. 67 (1): 87–93. Bibcode:2014AcSBP..67...87B. doi:10.5586/asbp.1998.012.
- Olech, Maria; Bystrek, Jan (2011). "Bryoria forsteri (Lichenized Ascomycotina), a new species from Antarctica". Acta Societatis Botanicorum Poloniae. 73 (2): 151–153. Bibcode:2011AcSBP..73..151O. doi:10.5586/asbp.2004.021.
- Leśniewska, Joanna; Kuczyńska, Izabela; Bystrek, Jan (2008). "The use of botanical microtechnique paraffin in anatomical studies of lichens". Annales Universitatis Mariae Curie-Sklodowska, Sectio C – Biologia. 63 (1): 93–107. doi:10.2478/v10067-008-0007-0.

=== Review articles ===
- Bystrek, Jan (1974). "Wrażliwość porostów na zanieczyszczenia atmosferyczne" [The sensitivity of lichens to air pollution]. Annales Universitatis Mariae Curie-Sklodowska, Sectio C – Biologia (in Polish). 29: 413–419.
- Bystrek, Jan (1985). "Porosty epifityczne wskaźnikiem czystości powietrza" [Epiphytic lichens as an indicator of air purity]. Folia Societatis Scientiarum Lublinensis (in Polish). 27 (1): 47–58.
- Bystrek, Jan; Kolanko, K. (1991). "Epifityczna flora Usneaceae i jej wymieranie w Puszczy Białowieskiej" [Epiphytic flora of the Usneaceae and its extinction in the Białowieża Primeval Forest]. Folia Societatis Scientiarum Lublinensis (in Polish). 32 (1–2): 3–7.
- Bystrek, Jan; Leonowicz, A. (1987). "Porosty i ich właściwości lecznicze" [Lichens and their healing properties]. Folia Societatis Scientiarum Lublinensis (in Polish). 29 (1): 27–37.
