= Oropogon salazinicus =

Scientific classification
- Domain: Eukaryota
- Kingdom: Fungi
- Division: Ascomycota
- Class: Lecanoromycetes
- Order: Lecanorales
- Family: Parmeliaceae
- Genus: Oropogon
- Species: O. salazinicus

Binomial name
- Oropogon salazinicus Essl. (1989)

Species of lichen

Oropogon salazinicus is a species of foliose lichen in the family Parmeliaceae. Found in East Asia, it was described as a new species by lichenologist Ted Esslinger in 1989. The type specimen was collected on Mount Nan-Fu-Ta-San, Taiwan, at an elevation greater than 1,500 m (4,900 ft). The lichen has also been recorded from Mount Kinabalu in Sabah, Malaysia. The specific epithet refers to the presence of salazinic acid, a major secondary compound in the lichen. Norstictic acid also occurs as a minor component. Molecular phylogenetic analysis shows that Oropogon salazinicus is in a clade that has a sister taxon relationship with a clade containing the species O. secalonicus, O. orientalis, and O. yunnanensis.
