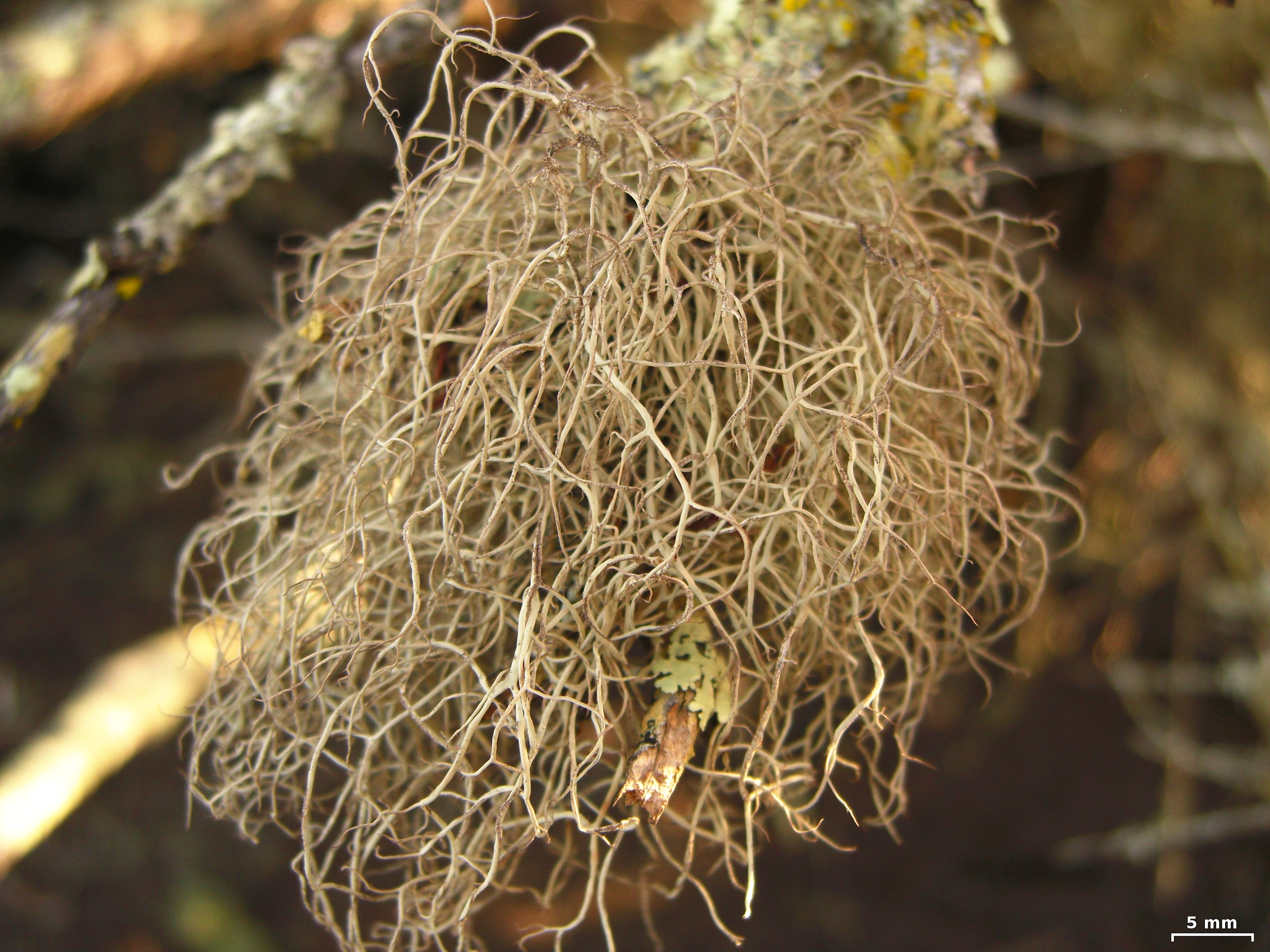
- Sulcaria isidiifera

Scientific classification
- Domain: Eukaryota
- Kingdom: Fungi
- Division: Ascomycota
- Class: Lecanoromycetes
- Order: Lecanorales
- Family: Parmeliaceae
- Genus: Sulcaria; Bystrek (1971)

Type species
- Sulcaria sulcata (Lév.) Bystrek (1971)

Species
- S. badia S. isidiifera S. spiralifera S. sulcata S. virens

= Sulcaria =

Genus of lichen

Sulcaria is a genus of three species of fruticose lichens in the family Parmeliaceae. Sulcaria was circumscribed by lichenologist Jan Bystrek in 1971. These lichens form hair-like or rope-like structures that hang from or grow upright on tree bark, with branches that develop distinctive lengthwise grooves as they age. They reproduce through disc-shaped fruiting bodies that contain large, dark brown spores with two unequal cells.

== Taxonomy ==
The Polish lichenologist Jan Bystrek introduced Sulcaria in 1971, separating it from the morphologically diverse genus Alectoria. In the protologue he based the new genus on its distinctive longitudinally-grooved ("sulcate") branches and its large, usually two-celled, dark brown ascospores. Bystrek designated Sulcaria sulcata (Lév.) Bystrek as the type species and recognised a second member, S. virens (Taylor) Bystrek, giving the genus an exclusively East-Asian distribution at that time.

Subsequent nomenclatural scrutiny showed that Bystrek's 1971 combination for the type species was not validly published because it failed to satisfy Article 41.4 of the Melbourne Code (the International Code of Nomenclature). Under this article, any new combination must include a full and direct reference to the place where the original basionym was validly published—typically a page number and publication details. Bystrek cited the epithet but omitted that essential bibliographic reference, so the name remained a nomen invalidum (invalid name). The omission was corrected six years later, when the name was validated as Sulcaria sulcata (Lév.) Bystrek ex Brodo & D.Hawksw. (1977), thereby firmly fixing both the genus and its type.

== Description ==
Sulcaria species form sturdy, hair-like thalli that are either bushy and several centimetres tall or else rope-like and pendulous. They anchor to the bark with a firm basal holdfast that is scarcely darkened in the hanging species but may be slightly blackened in the tufted forms. Primary branches are round in cross-section when young, but as they age—even quite early in growth—the cortical wall splits length-ways. This repeated tearing leaves each branch conspicuously grooved (sulcate) and sometimes partly flattened, a feature that gave the genus its name. No pseudocyphellae or surface warts occur, and the branches retain a pale green to yellow-green hue; dark brown or black tones are absent. Internally the cortex is unusually thick (often exceeding 150 μm) and built from densely glued, parallel hyphae, while the medulla is more loosely woven and houses plentiful Trebouxia algal cells just beneath the cortex.

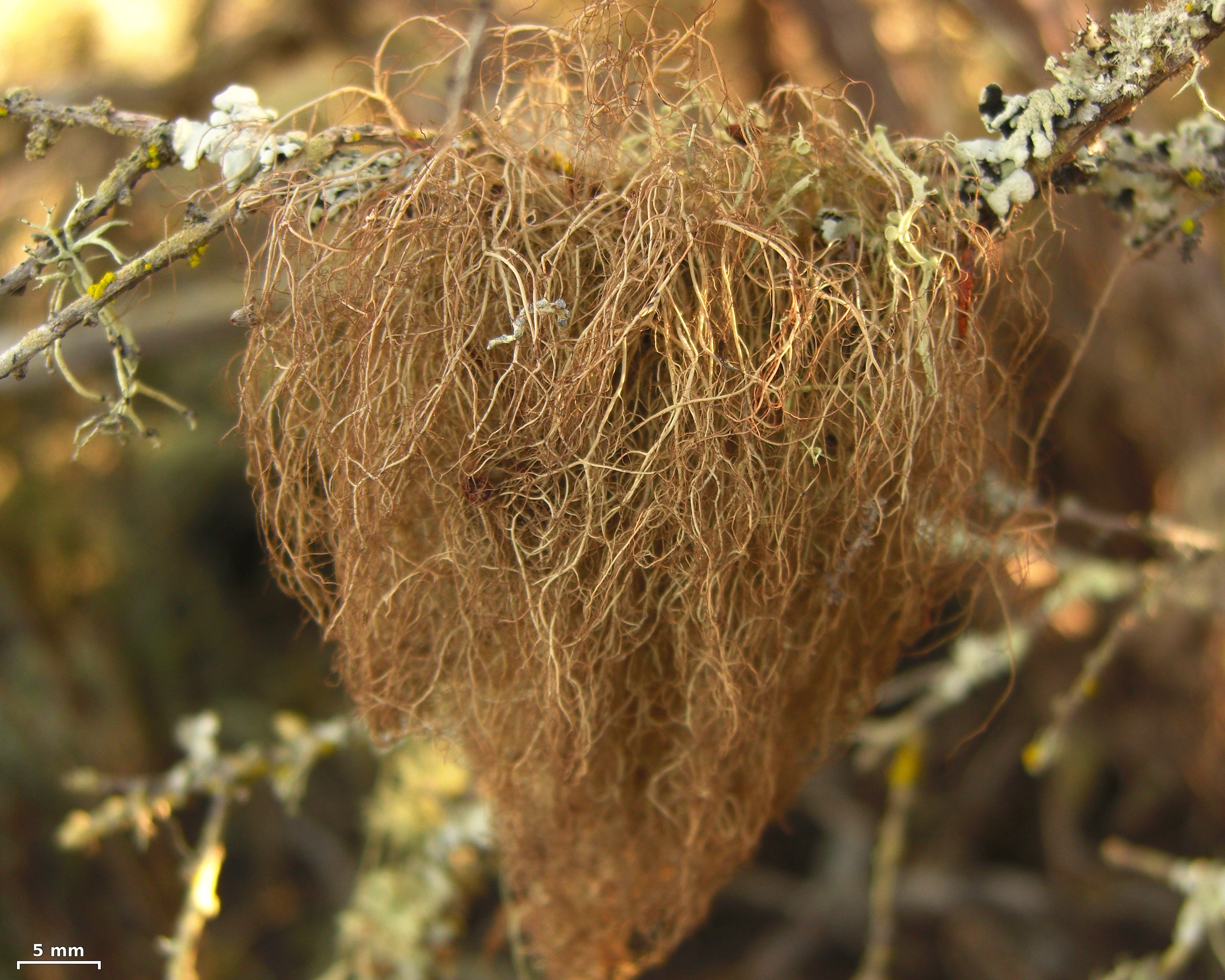
S. spiralifera

Fruiting bodies (apothecia) are commonly produced and are borne a little below the branch tips, their weight bending the branch so that the discs appear almost terminal. Each apothecium starts off cup-shaped but eventually becomes flat or slightly domed; the disc is mid- to dark-brown, edged by a thin thalline rim that projects slightly above the hymenium. Microscopically the hymenium is 100–150 μm tall and sits on a pale yellowish hypothecium about 25–30 μm thick. The colourless exciple can be more than 100 μm thick. Asci are club-shaped and contain two large, thick-walled spores (30–35 × about 16 μm) whose two cells are unequal in size and mature to a dark brown. Vegetative propagules (soredia or isidia) have not been observed to occur in this genus. Taken together—the longitudinally fissured branches, absence of pseudocyphellae, and large, brown, two-celled spores—these characters clearly separate Sulcaria from allied fruticose genera such as Alectoria, Bryopogon and Oropogon.

== Species ==
As of June 2025, Species Fungorum (in the Catalogue of Life) accept five species of Sulcaria:

- Sulcaria badia Brodo & D.Hawksw. (1977)
- Sulcaria isidiifera Brodo (1986)
- Sulcaria spiralifera (Brodo & D.Hawksw.) Myllys, Velmala & Goward (2014)
- Sulcaria sulcata (Lév.) Bystrek ex Brodo & D.Hawksw. (1977)
- Sulcaria virens (Taylor) Bystrek ex Brodo & D.Hawksw. (1977)
