= Cetrariopsis =

Scientific classification
- Domain: Eukaryota
- Kingdom: Fungi
- Division: Ascomycota
- Class: Lecanoromycetes
- Order: Lecanorales
- Family: Parmeliaceae
- Genus: Cetrariopsis; Kurok. (1980)

Type species
- Cetrariopsis wallichiana (Taylor) Kurok. (1980)

Synonyms
- Ahtia M.J.Lai (1980)

Genus of fungi

Cetrariopsis is a genus of foliose lichens in the large family Parmeliaceae. The genus contains three species, including the type, Cetrariopsis wallichiana.

== Taxonomy ==
Cetrariopsis was circumscribed by Japanese lichenologist Syo Kurokawa in 1980. The type species was originally called Sticta wallichiana by Thomas Taylor, who described it in 1847.

In 2017, Divakar and colleagues used a recently developed "temporal phylogenetic" approach to identify temporal bands for specific taxonomic ranks in the family Parmeliaceae, suggesting that groups of species that diverged within the time window of 29.45–32.55 million years ago represent genera. They proposed to synonymize Cetrariopsis with Nephromopsis, along with several other Parmelioid genera, so that all the genera within the Parmeliaceae are about the same age. Although some of their proposed taxonomic changes were accepted, the synonymization of the Parmelioid genera with Nephromopsis was not accepted in a recent analysis.

== Species ==
- Cetrariopsis lai A.Thell & Randlane (1995)
- Cetrariopsis pallescens (Schaer.) A.Thell & Randlane (1995)
- Cetrariopsis wallichiana (Taylor) Kurok. (1980)
