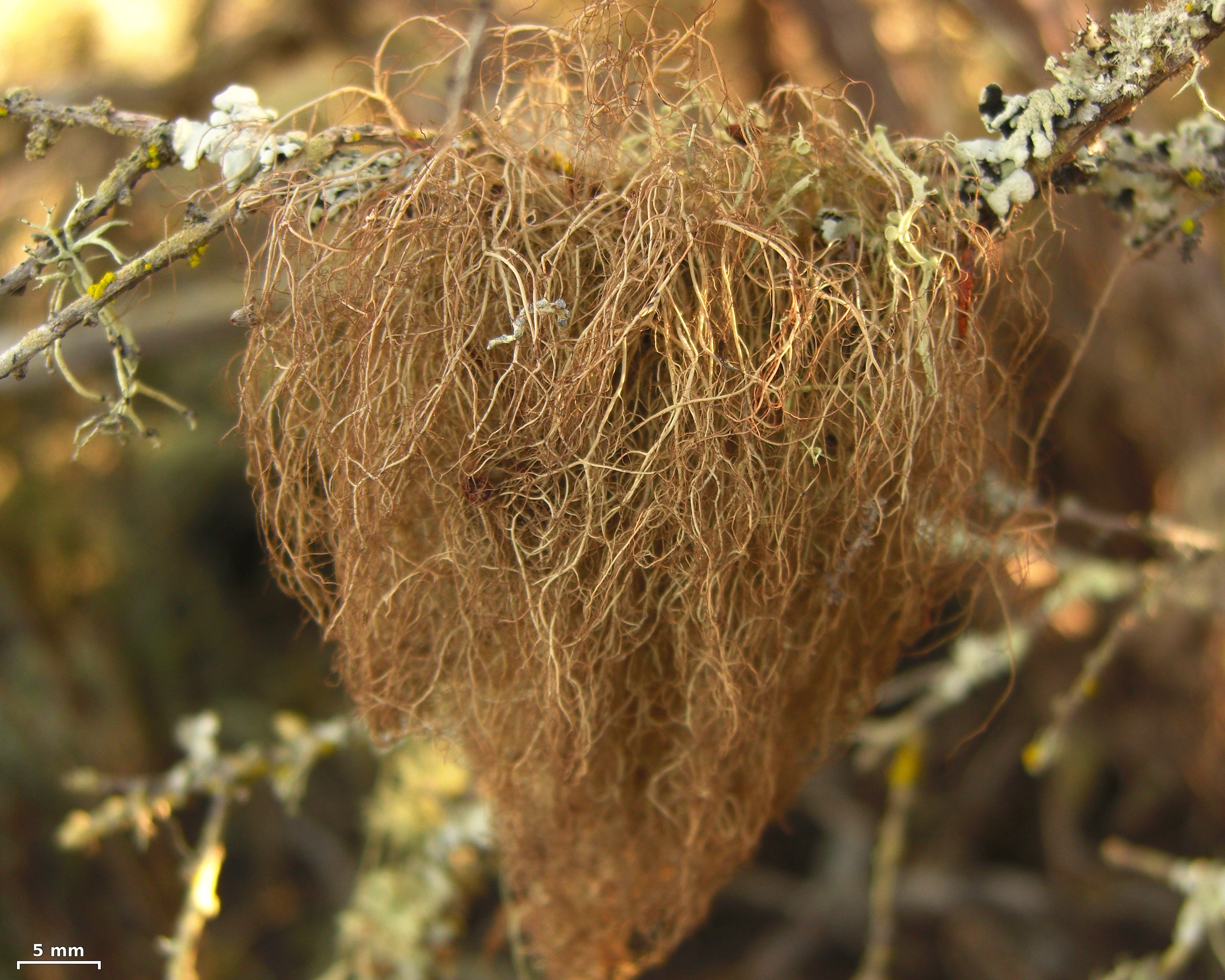
- in Los Osos Oaks State Natural Reserve, California

Conservation status
- Vulnerable (NatureServe)

Scientific classification
- Kingdom: Fungi
- Division: Ascomycota
- Class: Lecanoromycetes
- Order: Lecanorales
- Family: Parmeliaceae
- Genus: Sulcaria
- Species: S. spiralifera

Binomial name
- Sulcaria spiralifera (Brodo & D.Hawksw.) Myllys, Velmala & Goward (2014)

Varieties
- S. spiralifera var. pseudocapillaris (Brodo & D.Hawksw.) McCune (2022)

Synonyms
- Bryoria pseudocapillaris Brodo & D.Hawksw. (1977); Bryoria spiralifera Brodo & D.Hawksw. (1977)

= Sulcaria spiralifera =

Species of lichen

Sulcaria spiralifera is a species of fruticose lichen in the family Parmeliaceae. First described in 1977 as a species of Bryoria, it was transferred to the genus Sulcaria in 2014 based on DNA analysis. The species comprises two chemical variants now recognized as varieties: the typical variety and var. pseudocapillaris, which differ in their chemical composition and spot test reactions. It is found in the northwestern United States, where it grows as an epiphyte, hanging from a variety of tree species in open or shaded maritime forests. The lichen is characterized by its pendulous brown thallus with spiral-arranged white pores (pseudocyphellae) on its surface, extending 4–12 cm (1 9/16–4 3/4 in) in length.

== Taxonomy ==
The species was first formally described in 1977 by the lichenologists Irwin Brodo and David Hawksworth as a species of Bryoria. It was transferred to the genus Sulcaria in 2014 by Leena Myllys, Saara Velmala, and Trevor Goward. Using DNA analysis and molecular phylogenetics, they also determined that Bryoria pseudocapillaris, another taxon described by Brodo and Hawskworth in 1977, was actually the same species as Sulcaria spiralifera, and placed the former taxon in synonymy with the latter. More recent research has shown that while B. pseudocapillaris and S. spiralifera represent the same species, they exhibit distinct chemical variations, leading to their current classification as varieties rather than separate species. DNA studies have revealed weak genetic differentiation between these variants, but since they often occur in the same geographic areas and share core characteristics, they are now treated as chemical variants of a single species, with B. pseudocapillaris reclassified as S. spiralifera var. pseudocapillaris.

== Description ==
The thallus of Sulcaria spiralifera usually hangs in a more or less pendent fashion, extending from 4–12 cm (1 9/16–4 3/4 in) in length. Displaying colors ranging from pale to dark brown, the exterior cortex can either be dull or exhibit a subtle sheen, frequently appearing pruinose, or powdery, in the norstictic acid chemotype. The darkest brown coloration is typically found on thalli growing at the western edges of dune forests, where they are exposed to sand abrasion, salt spray, wind, and high light levels, suggesting this coloration may be an environmental adaptation rather than a genetic trait. It features predominantly irregular branching without any apparent primary branches, and the angles created at these junctions are usually acute. The branches themselves have diameters falling between 0.10 and 0.35 mm, with small, spine-like side branches emerging near the tips.

One of the distinguishing characteristics of this lichen is the presence of pseudocyphellae, or small pores on the surface of the thallus. These typically stand out due to their white color and can be straight or wrap around the branches in a spiral fashion. Their size ranges from 1 to 4 mm in length, they sometimes exhibit a furrowed texture, and they may be found either densely packed or sporadically. However, soralia and isidia, structures associated with vegetative reproduction, are absent in this species. The presence of apothecia and conidiomata, structures linked to sexual and asexual reproduction, respectively, have yet to be observed in this species.

Chemically, Sulcaria spiralifera presents two distinct chemotypes which are now recognized as taxonomic varieties. The first chemotype, classified as S. spiralifera var. pseudocapillaris, responds to a potassium hydroxide (K) spot test with a deep yellow color and is known to contain alectorialic acid, barbatolic acid, and an unidentified substance. The second chemotype, representing typical S. spiralifera, yields a yellow result when tested with K, which then turns red. It contains norstictic acid, connorstictic acid, and atranorin. While these chemical differences are significant for identification, the variants also show subtle morphological differences, though they are generally similar in their overall appearance and growth patterns.

== Habitat and distribution ==
Found along the west coast of North America, Sulcaria spiralifera is a seldom seen yet occasionally locally abundant species native to regions spanning from northern California to Washington. Its preferred habitats include open or shaded maritime forests, where it is found growing on lodgepole pines (Pinus contorta), Sitka spruces (Picea sitchensis), and an array of shrubs and deciduous trees. The species is most abundant in high exposure sites such as forest edges along sand dunes and large canopy gaps. In lodgepole pine stands, which have relatively open canopies, it occurs abundantly in both the understory and upper canopy. However, in Sitka spruce stands with more closed canopies, it is mostly restricted to the upper tree crowns.

The species thrives in a climate characterized by cool rainy winters and mild dry summers, where fog plays a significant role in its moisture requirements. Its distribution closely correlates with the coastal summer fog zone, occurring in areas that experience between 60 and 80 foggy days per year. On a typical foggy day in coastal northern California forests, these lichens can receive moisture equivalent to 0.3 cm of rainfall.
