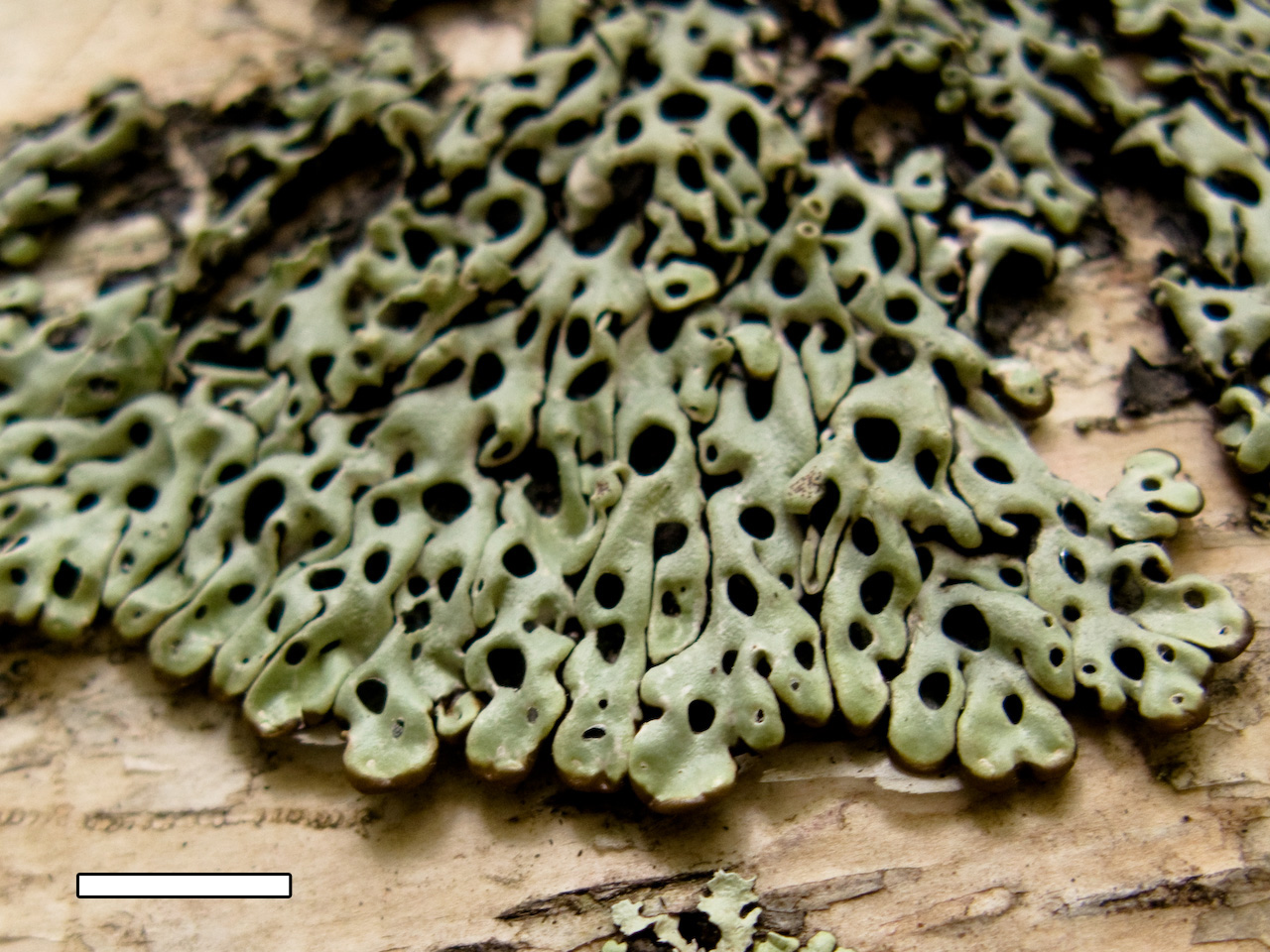
- Menegazzia pertransita growing on a tree in New Zealand. Scale bar = 1 cm.

Scientific classification
- Domain: Eukaryota
- Kingdom: Fungi
- Division: Ascomycota
- Class: Lecanoromycetes
- Order: Lecanorales
- Family: Parmeliaceae
- Genus: Menegazzia
- Species: M. pertransita

Binomial name
- Menegazzia pertransita (Stirt.) R.Sant. (1942)

Synonyms
- Parmelia pertransita Stirt. (1877); Parmelia weindorferi f. endocitrina Hillmann (1938); Menegazzia weindorferi f. endocitrina (Hillmann) R.Sant. (1942)

= Menegazzia pertransita =

Species of lichen

Menegazzia pertransita is a species of foliose lichen in the large lichen family Parmeliaceae. It is found in New Zealand, Australia, and South America. The lichen was first formally described by Scottish physician and bryologist James Stirton in 1877 as Parmelia pertransita. Swedish lichenologist Rolf Santesson transferred it to the genus Menegazzia in 1942.

== See also ==
- List of Menegazzia species
