= Bulborrhizina =

Scientific classification
- Domain: Eukaryota
- Kingdom: Fungi
- Division: Ascomycota
- Class: Lecanoromycetes
- Order: Lecanorales
- Family: Parmeliaceae
- Genus: Bulborrhizina; Kurok. (1994)

Type species
- Bulborrhizina africana Kurok. (1994)

Genus of fungi

Bulborrhizina is a genus of lichenized fungi in the family Parmeliaceae. The genus is monotypic, containing the single species Bulborrhizina africana, found in Mozambique.

== See also ==
- List of Parmeliaceae genera
