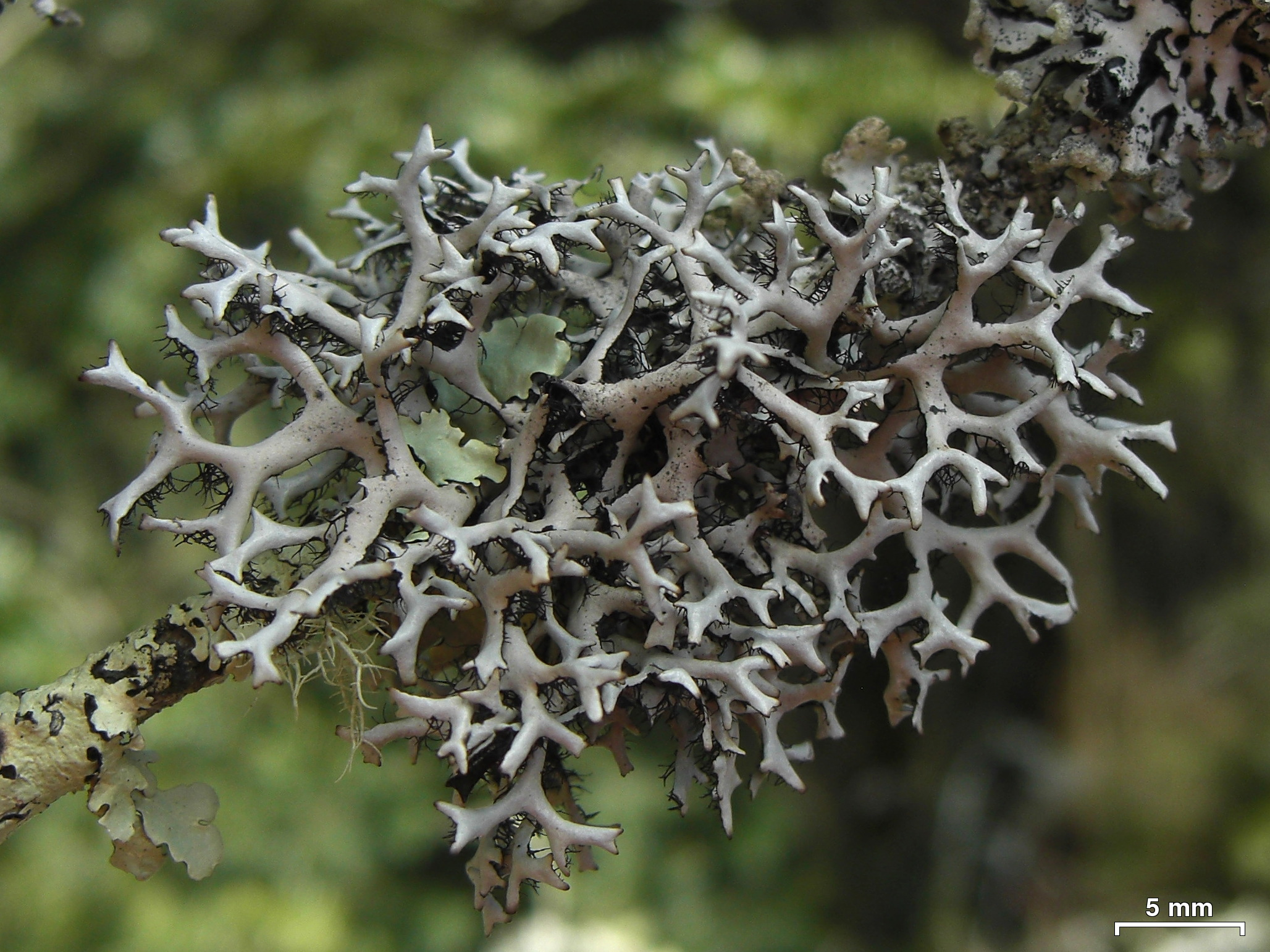

Conservation status
- Vulnerable (NatureServe)

Scientific classification
- Kingdom: Fungi
- Division: Ascomycota
- Class: Lecanoromycetes
- Order: Lecanorales
- Family: Parmeliaceae
- Genus: Hypotrachyna
- Species: H. catawbiensis

Binomial name
- Hypotrachyna catawbiensis (Degel.) Divakar, A.Crespo, Sipman, Elix & Lumbsch (2013)

Synonyms
- List: Parmelia sorocheila var. catawbiensis Degel. (1941); Parmelia catawbiensis (Degel.) Hale & M.Wirth (1971); Cetrariastrum catawbiense (Degel.) W.L.Culb. & C.F.Culb. (1981); Everniastrum catawbiense (Degel.) Hale ex Sipman (1986)

= Hypotrachyna catawbiensis =

Species of lichen

Hypotrachyna catawbiensis, the powder-tipped antler lichen, is a species of foliose lichen in the family Parmeliaceae. First described in 1941, it forms pale ivory to greenish-gray leaf-like growths that attach loosely to tree bark or rocks. The lichen has narrow, forking lobes that often curl inward, and produces powdery structures called soredia for asexual reproduction. Though originally discovered in the Appalachian Mountains of the eastern United States, it has since been found across tropical and temperate regions worldwide, including Mexico, South America, East Africa, China, and Papua New Guinea. It usually grows at high elevations. Genetic studies have shown that despite this widely scattered distribution, populations from different continents belong to the same species. It typically grows as an epiphyte (an organism that grows on other plants) on hardwood trees, though it can also be found on conifers and rocks.

== Taxonomy ==
The lichen was first described in 1941 by the Swedish lichenologist Gunnar Degelius. He initially classified it as a variety of Parmelia sorocheila, distinguishing it from the typical variety by its K− reaction in its inner layer (medulla). The type specimen was collected from Mount Le Conte in Tennessee, growing on Rhododendron stems at an elevation of 1,910 m (6,270 ft). Additional specimens were found growing on twigs of Picea rubens and Abies fraseri in the same area. Mason Hale and Michael Wirth elevated the taxon to full species status in 1971, based on its distinctive chemical properties, smaller size, and its apparently endemic distribution in the southern Appalachians.

In 1976, Mason Hale transferred the species to Everniastrum. William and Chicita Culberson later transferred the species to Cetrariastrum (1981) when they determined that Everniastrum—the genus in which it was previously placed—was nomenclaturally invalid. This was because Everniastrum had been based on a section name published by Auguste-Marie Hue in 1898 that lacked the required Latin description. Although Culberson and Culberson had planned to validate Everniastrum, the publication of Cetrariastrum by Harrie Sipman in 1980 made this the correct genus name for these lichens. Sipman validated the name Everniastrum in 1986 and made the necessary new combination to transfer the species back to that genus. However, in 2013, Pradeep Divakar and colleagues transferred the species to Hypotrachyna when molecular phylogenetics studies showed that Everniastrum, Cetrariastrum and Parmelinopsis were nested within Hypotrachyna sensu lato (in the broad sense). Rather than recognize multiple small genera that would be difficult to circumscribe morphologically, they chose to expand the concept of Hypotrachyna and reduce the other genera to subgeneric rank within it. Hypotrachyna catawbiensis is a member of the large lichen family Parmeliaceae.

This lichen is commonly known as the "powder-tipped antler lichen". Its species epithet catawbiensis refers to Rhododendron catawbiense, the host plant of the type specimen.

== Description ==
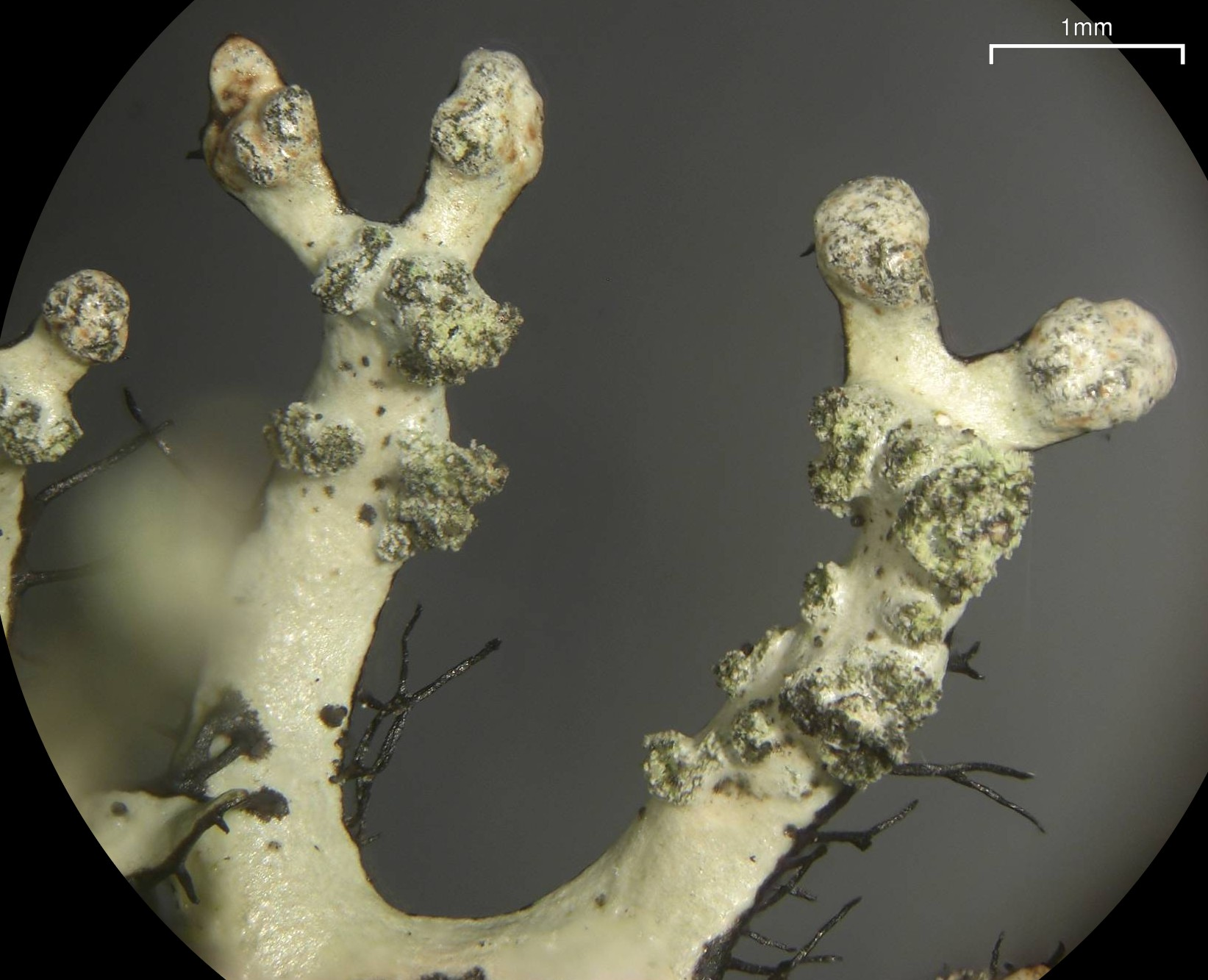
Close up of terminal branches showing truncate lobe tips, powdery soredia, and rhizines.

The lichen's vegetative body (thallus) measures 3–4 cm (1.2–1.6 in) long, occasionally reaching 7 cm (2.8 in), forming foliose to somewhat tufted bushy growths that attach very loosely to the surface. Despite being a foliose lichen, H. catawbiensis has a growth pattern that makes it resemble a fruticose (bushy) form. The flattened segments (lobes) are 0.5–1 mm wide, occasionally expanding to 2 mm. These lobes branch in a regularly forking (dichotomous) pattern and may be flat or curled inward toward their lower surface. The lobe tips are typically squared-off (truncate) and only occasionally have cilia.

The upper surface is pale ivory or greenish-gray in color and develops specialized powdery structures called soredia that emerge through the surface, particularly at or near the lobe tips. Along the margins of the lobes are small root-like attachments called rhizines, which extend up to 1 mm in length (occasionally 2 mm) and can be simple or sparingly branched.

The lower surface of the thallus is black or becomes brown-colored toward the tips of the lobes. It appears smooth or shows subtle lengthwise wrinkles, and is either bare or has only a few scattered rhizines. No fruiting bodies (apothecia) or asexual spore-producing structures (pycnidia) have been observed in this species.

When tested with chemical reagents for common spot tests, the outer layer (cortex) shows K+ (yellow), while the medulla is K−, C+ (pink), and PD−. The medulla contains gyrophoric acid as a major component and protolichesterinic acid as a submajor component. If the medulla does not react with K, it will still show KC+ (pink).

== Habitat and distribution ==
The species has a disjunct global distribution. In North America, it grows at elevations of 1,650–2,000 m (5,410–6,560 ft) in the mountains of western North Carolina and Virginia and eastern Tennessee, United States, extending north to Fundy National Park in New Brunswick, Canada. In the southern Appalachian Mountains, it is most frequently encountered at high elevations, though nowhere in its range does it occur in great abundance. It grows primarily as an epiphyte on hardwood trees, particularly Prunus, Rhododendron, Acer, and Betula, and less commonly on conifers like Abies and Picea. About 60% of known collections are from hardwoods, 25% from conifers, and 15% from rock substrates. In the Appalachians, it is commonly found growing alongside Pseudevernia cladonia and other species of Hypotrachyna.

The species has also been found in east-central Mexico, and at elevations of 2,050–3,000 m (6,730–9,840 ft) in Costa Rica, Venezuela and Ecuador. In Asia, it occurs in the Hengduan Mountains of China at elevations of 2,100–2,800 m (6,900–9,200 ft), where it commonly grows on Pinus bark, and at 3,450 m (11,320 ft) in the Baliem Valley of Papua New Guinea. It has also been recorded at 3,900 m (12,800 ft) in Uganda. Populations found outside North America tend to have longer and more linear thallus lobes, more abundant and somewhat longer marginal rhizines, and (in South American specimens) more abundant soralia distributed over the distal parts of the lobes, rather than being confined to the lobe tips as in Appalachian specimens. Molecular phylogenetic analysis confirms that populations from different continents belong to the same evolutionary lineage despite their disjunct distribution.
