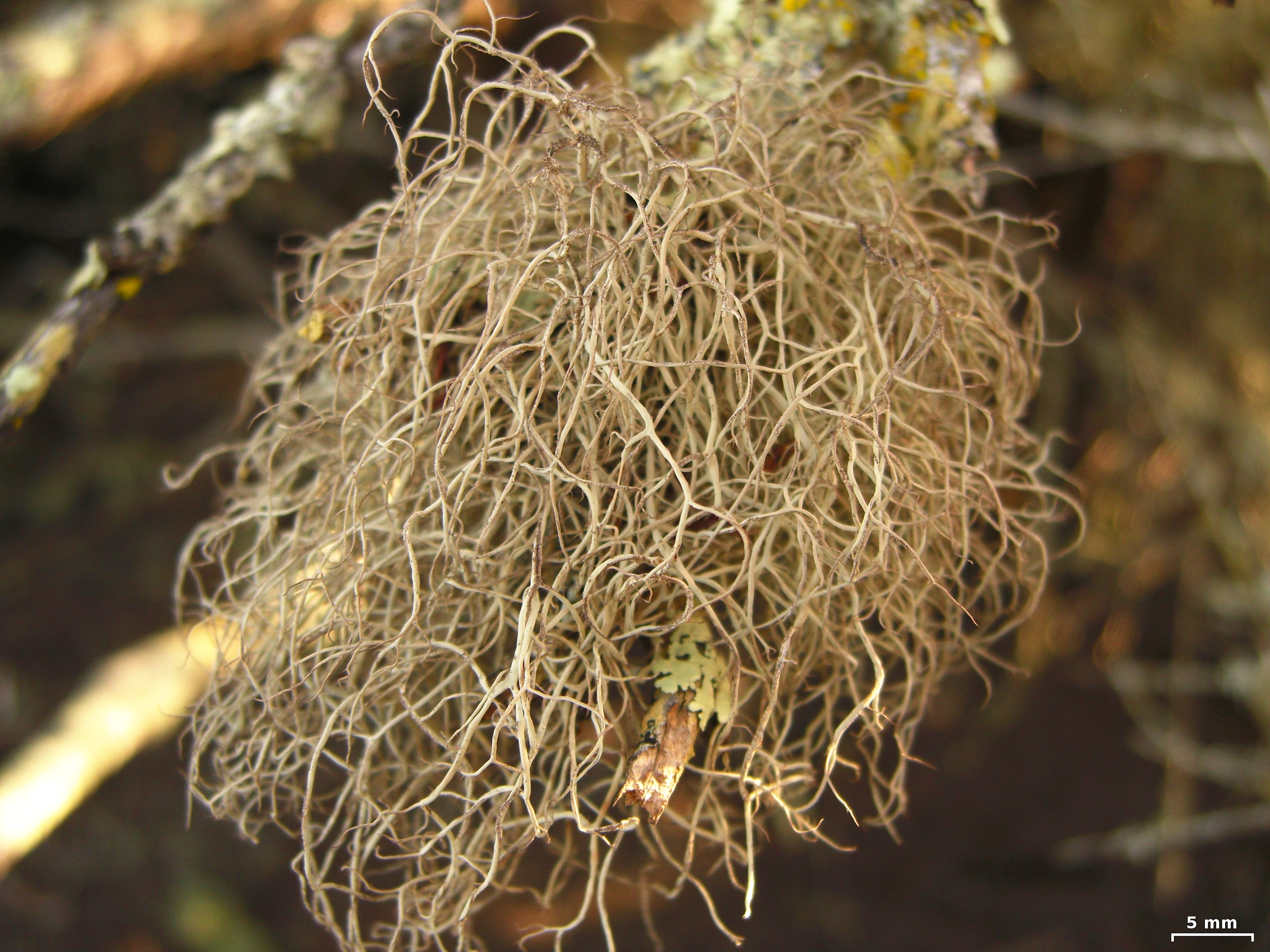

Conservation status
- Critically Endangered (IUCN 3.1)

- Critically Imperiled (NatureServe)

Scientific classification
- Kingdom: Fungi
- Division: Ascomycota
- Class: Lecanoromycetes
- Order: Lecanorales
- Family: Parmeliaceae
- Genus: Sulcaria
- Species: S. isidiifera

Binomial name
- Sulcaria isidiifera Brodo (1986)

= Sulcaria isidiifera =

Species of lichen

Sulcaria isidiifera, commonly known as the splitting yarn lichen, is a rare species of pendent (hanging) fruticose lichen in the family Parmeliaceae. It has a dull yellowish-white to light brown and reddish-brown thallus and is typically 3–5 cm (1.2–2.0 in) long. It is only known to occur in the Los Osos Oaks State Natural Reserve, in the Central Coast of California region, where it grows on a variety of shrubs.

== Taxonomy ==
It was formally described as a new species in 1986 by the lichenologist Irwin M. Brodo. The type specimen was collected in 1984 from Los Osos Oaks State Natural Reserve, in the Central Coast of California region; it was growing on Adenostoma fasciculatum. It is commonly known as the "splitting yarn lichen" although it also has the common name of Iron Maiden's Hair Lichen.

== Description ==
Sulcaria isidiifera is characterized by a thallus that is a dull yellowish-white, transitioning into light brown and reddish-brown at the more sun-exposed tips, and occasionally displaying shades of olive-gray. The lichen spans 3–5 cm (1.2–2.0 in) in length and features a branching pattern that ranges from isotomic (equal branching) to anisotomic-dichotomous (unequal branching with divisions). Unique to this species are its more-or-less perpendicular branches that emerge from splits in the thallus, further splitting lengthwise and opening into relatively wide linear soralia. These soralia are filled with spinulose (spine-like) isidia and spinules, which often have brown tips. The main branches of the lichen are about 0.3–0.5 mm in width, and the overall structure is quite brittle. Neither apothecia (reproductive structures where spores develop) nor pycnidia (structures producing asexual spores) have been observed in this species. In terms of standard chemical spot tests, it is K−, C−, KC−, and Pd+ (orange) on the cortex. Sulcaria isidiifera contains protocetraric acid as its major lichen product.

Although some other fruticose lichens have been mistaken for this species, including Alectoria sarmentosa, some Usnea species, Bryoria spiralifera and other pale species in the genus Bryoria, none of them display the distinct feature of having longitudinal soralia that split open to expose isidia.

== Habitat and distribution ==
Sulcaria isidiifera is exclusively found near its original discovery site, confined within a region less than 7 mi (11 km) in diameter. This lichen grows in mature coastal chaparral scrub environments. Within these coastal scrubland habitats, it shows a non-specific preference, growing on a variety of shrubs including Adenostoma fasciculatum, Quercus dumosa, Quercus agrifolia, Ceanothus ramulosus, and other unidentified shrub species.
