= Grodzany =

- Village
- Location within Poland
- Coordinates: 51°1′N 22°32′E
- Country: Poland
- Voivodeship: Lublin
- County: Lublin
- Gmina: Bychawa

Grodzany [ɡrɔˈd͡zanɨ] is a village in the administrative district of Gmina Bychawa, within Lublin County, Lublin Voivodeship, in eastern Poland.
