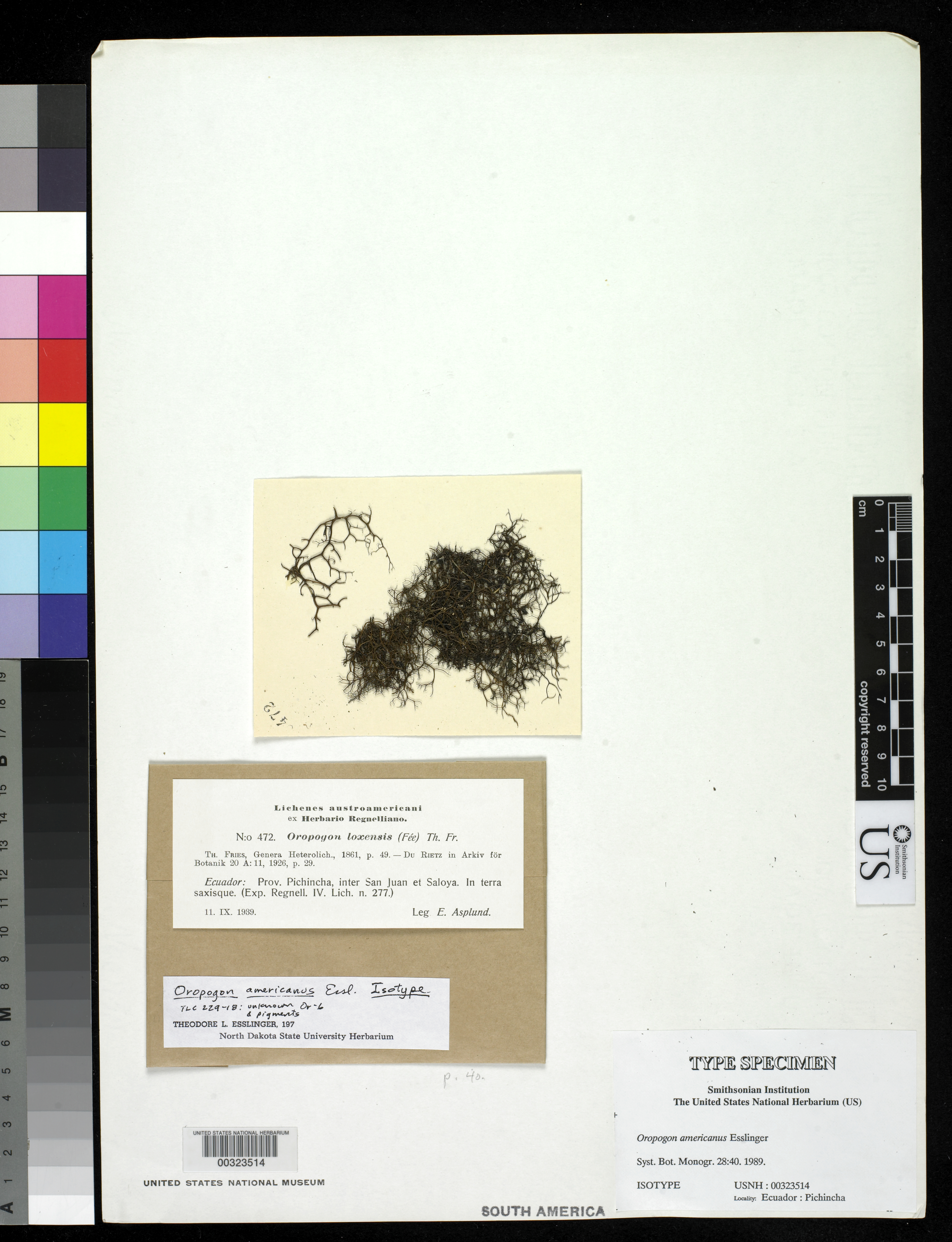
- herbarium specimen of Oropogon americanus

Scientific classification
- Domain: Eukaryota
- Kingdom: Fungi
- Division: Ascomycota
- Class: Lecanoromycetes
- Order: Lecanorales
- Family: Parmeliaceae
- Genus: Oropogon; Th.Fr. (1861)

Type species
- Oropogon loxensis (Fée) Zukal (1895)

Synonyms
- Atestia Trevis. (1861)

= Oropogon =

Genus of lichen

Oropogon is a genus of lichen-forming ascomycetes in the large family Parmeliaceae. It is a genus of roughly 40 currently accepted species. It was previously included in the family Alectoriaceae, but this group has since been subsumed into the Parmeliaceae.

All members of the genus have a fruticose growth form. The most obvious distinguishing feature character which separates Oropogon from the rest of the family is the large brown, muriform ascospores (i.e. with transverse and longitudinal walls) that occur singly in each ascus.

== Description ==
Oropogon species are medium-to-large fruticose (shrub-like) lichens whose overall shape falls into two main growth forms. Caespitose thalli resemble irregular tufts: they are no more than twice as tall as they are wide and lack a single dominant trunk. Pendent thalli hang downward from their point of attachment, producing long, nearly parallel branches that can be many times the width of the lichen. A few specimens adopt an intermediate, "subpendent" habit, beginning as a tuft near the base but ending in slender, dangling branch tips. Growth form can shift with microhabitat; for example, the normally tufted O. loxensis may develop trailing shoots when moisture and shelter permit, while ground-dwelling individuals often appear almost upright because their branch bases are propped against surrounding vegetation.

Branches divide mainly by equal forks (isodichotomies); unequal splits are uncommon and largely confined to a handful of species. Caespitose taxa usually have wide branch angles (70–90°) and short internodes under 10 mm, whereas pendent taxa show narrower forks (20–60°) and internodes that may reach 25 mm or more. Colour is variable but informative in broad strokes. Most species are tan, brown or black, yet a distinct New-World subset—including the widespread O. loxensis—is pale grey to whitish, sometimes dusted with a thin grey pruina (frosty coating). These lighter species contain atranorin and related cortical chemicals, which dull to black with age, while the dark olive-brown hue of O. byssaceus is due to a pigment that dissolves in potassium hydroxide solution.

In cross-section the outer skin (cortex) consists of tightly packed, length-wise hyphae, forming a tough prosoplectenchymatous layer much like that of the morphologically similar Bryoria. Beneath it lies the medulla, a looser tangle of hyphae that occurs in two structural modes. In most species the medulla is hollow: older branches possess a sizeable central cavity interrupted only by thin diaphragms or patchy granular tissue, and many of their cortex breaks open as true perforations. Other species—particularly O. loxensis and its relatives—have a filled medulla that leaves only small voids near the cortex or behind surface pores. The cortex is punctured by pseudocyphellae that range from narrow cracks to obvious holes; whether a pore is "open" depends on whether medullary tissue underlies it. Four combinations of filled versus hollow medulla and perforate versus non-perforate pseudocyphellae occur, but these features have limited diagnostic value beyond small groups of species.

Specialised asexual propagules are uncommon. Granular soralia are reliably present only in O. aliphaticus, while spine-like outgrowths (spinules) abound in roughly one-third of O. loxensis thalli and appear sporadically in a few other taxa. Most species rely on fragmentation—the brittle branches snap readily when dry—or on sexual reproduction. Apothecia (fruiting bodies) are frequent in about half the genus and produce a single, very large, muriform (multi-chambered) brown ascospores per ascus, reaching up to 157 × 52 μm. These oversized spores, often seen clinging to the thallus after discharge, probably disperse poorly over long distances, helping to explain the patchy, often local distributions typical of Oropogon lichens.

== Species ==
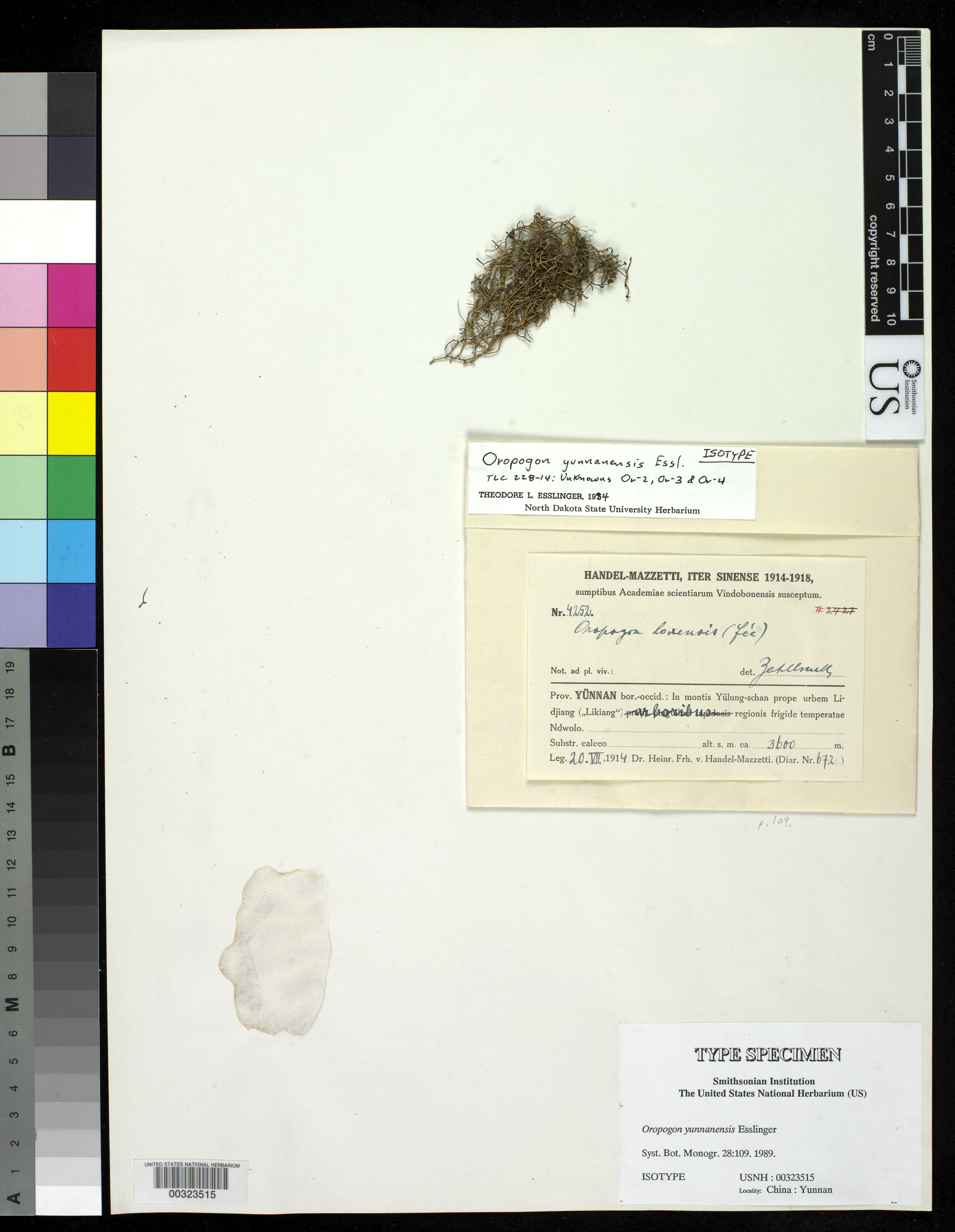
Oropogon yunnanensis

- Oropogon aliphaticus Essl. (1989) – Venezuela
- Oropogon americanus Essl. (1989) – Ecuador
- Oropogon asiaticus Asahina (1937) – Japan
- Oropogon atranorinus Essl. (1981) – Venezuela
- Oropogon barbaticus Essl. (1989) – Venezuela
- Oropogon bicolor Essl. (1989) – Venezuela
- Oropogon bolivianus Essl. (1989) – Bolivia
- Oropogon byssaceus Essl. (1989) – Venezuela
- Oropogon caespitosus Essl. (1989)– Mexico
- Oropogon cinereus Essl. (1989) – Peru
- Oropogon colibor Essl. (1989) – Costa Rica
- Oropogon diffractaicus Essl. (1989) – Dominican Republic
- Oropogon evernicus Essl. & S.D.Leav. (2013)
- Oropogon fissuratus Essl. (1989) – Venezuela
- Oropogon formosanus Asahina (1952) – Taiwan
- Oropogon granulosus Essl. (1989) – Venezuela
- Oropogon halei Essl. (1989) – Venezuela
- Oropogon herzogii Essl. (1989) – Bolivia
- Oropogon imperforatus Essl. (1989) – Guatemala
- Oropogon lateralis Essl. (1989) – Venezuela
- Oropogon lopezii Essl. (1981) – Venezuela
- Oropogon lorobic Essl. (1989) – Panama
- Oropogon loxensis (Fée) Zukal (1895)
- Oropogon macilentus Essl. (1989) – Ecuador
- Oropogon maurus Essl. (1989) – Venezuela
- Oropogon mexicanus Essl. (1989) – Mexico
- Oropogon orientalis (Gyeln.) Essl. (1989)
- Oropogon parietinus Essl. (1989) – Venezuela
- Oropogon pendulus Essl. (1989) – Mexico
- Oropogon protocetraricus S.D.Leav. & Essl. (2013)
- Oropogon pseudoloxensis Essl. (1989) – Venezuela
- Oropogon salazinicus Essl. (1989) – Taiwan
- Oropogon satoanus Essl. (1989) – Taiwan
- Oropogon secalonicus Essl. (1989) – Yunnan
- Oropogon sperlingii Essl. (1989) – Panama
- Oropogon striatulus Essl. (1989) – Costa Rica
- Oropogon tanakae Asahina (1952) – Japan
- Oropogon venezuelensis Essl. (1989) – Venezuela
- Oropogon yunnanensis Essl. (1989) – Yunnan
