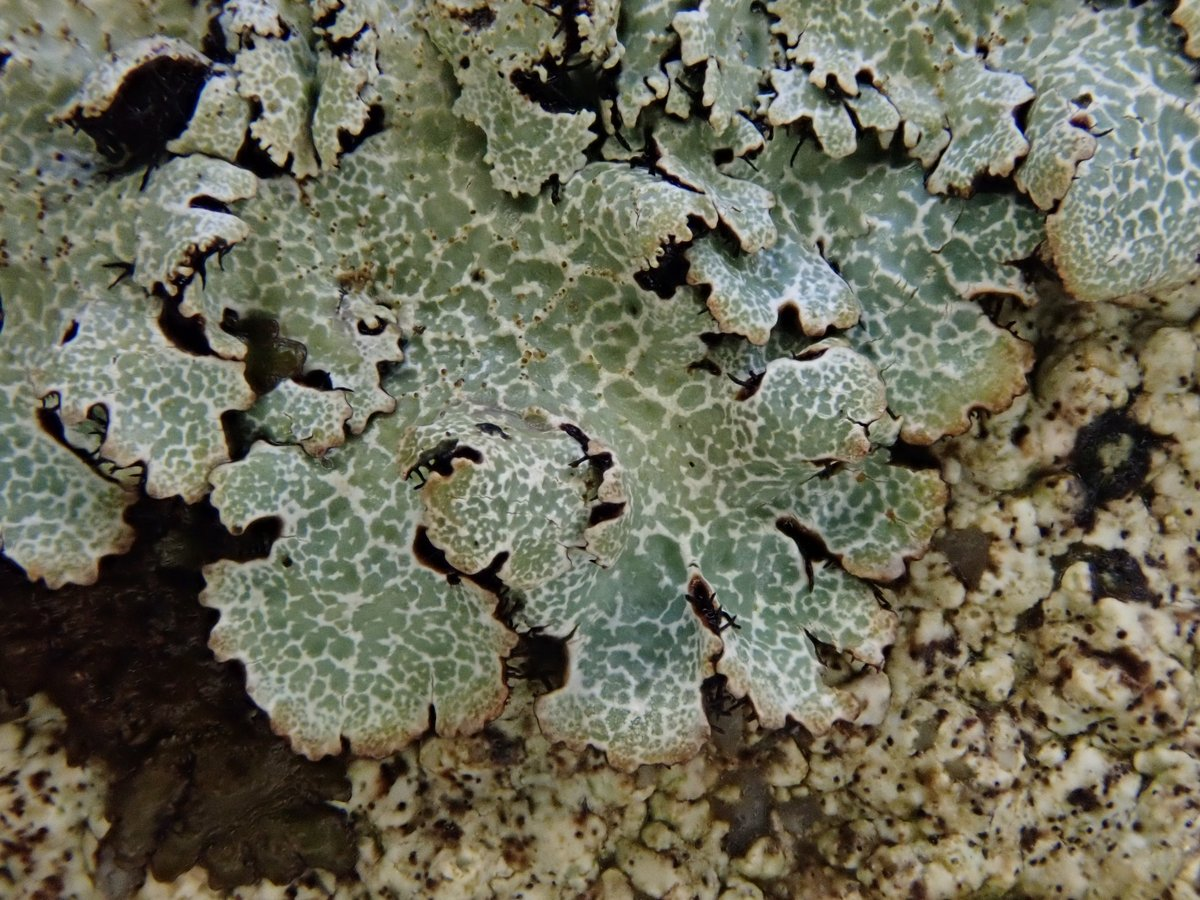
- Parmelia saxatilis

Scientific classification
- Kingdom: Fungi
- Division: Ascomycota
- Class: Lecanoromycetes
- Order: Lecanorales
- Family: Parmeliaceae; Zenker (1827)

Type genus
- Parmelia Ach. (1803)

Genera
- See text

= Parmeliaceae =

Family of lichens

The Parmeliaceae is a large and diverse family of Lecanoromycetes. With over 2700 species in 71 genera, it is the largest family of lichen-forming fungi. The most speciose genera in the family are the well-known groups: Xanthoparmelia (822 species), Usnea (355 species), Parmotrema (255 species), and Hypotrachyna (262 species).

Nearly all members of the family have a symbiotic association with a green alga (most often Trebouxia spp., but Asterochloris spp. are known to associate with some species). The majority of Parmeliaceae species have a foliose, fruticose, or subfruticose growth form. The morphological diversity and complexity exhibited by this group is enormous, and many specimens are exceedingly difficult to identify down to the species level.

The family has a cosmopolitan distribution, and is present in a wide range of habitats and climatic regions. This includes everywhere from roadside pavement to alpine rocks, from tropical rainforest trees to subshrubs in the Arctic tundra. Members of the Parmeliaceae are found in most terrestrial environments. Several Parmeliaceae species have been assessed for the global IUCN Red List.

== Taxonomy ==
Based on several molecular phylogenetic studies, the Parmeliaceae as currently circumscribed has been shown to be a monophyletic group. This circumscription is inclusive of the previously described families Alectoriaceae, Anziaceae, Hypogymniaceae, and Usneaceae, which are all no longer recognised by most lichen systematists. However, despite the family being one of the most thoroughly studied groups of lichens, several relationships within the family still remain unclear. Phylogenetic analysis supports the existence of seven distinct clades in the family. The Parmelioid clade is the largest, containing 27 genera and about 1850 species – about two-thirds of the species in the family.

- Alectorioid clade (5 genera)
- Cetrarioid clade (17 genera)
- Hypogymnioid clade (4 genera)
- Letharioid clade (2 genera)
- Parmelioid clade (27 genera)
- Psiloparmelioid clade (2 genera)
- Usneoid clade (1 genus)

An early molecular phylogenetic study in 1998 using nuclear ribosomal DNA sequences challenged some of the morphology-based classifications, particularly finding a close relationship between Cetraria and Vulpicida that contradicted previous assumptions based on ascus structure differences.

Many Parmeliaceae genera do not group phylogenetically into any of these clades, and these, along with genera that have not yet had their DNA studied, are classed as "genera with uncertain affinities".

The Parmeliaceae has been divided into two subfamilies, Protoparmelioideae and Parmelioideae. The diversification of various Parmelioideae lineages may have been a result of gaining innovations that provided adaptive advantages, such as melanin production in the genus Melanohalea. Diversification of the Protoparmelioideae occurred during the Miocene. The Parmelioid clade is the largest in the Parmeliaceae, with more than 1800 species and a centre of distribution in the Southern Hemisphere.

== Generic classification ==
The classification history of Parmeliaceae reflects evolving approaches to fungal taxonomy over two centuries. When Erik Acharius first described Parmelia in 1803, it encompassed a broad range of foliose lichens with rounded apothecia. By the mid-1800s, researchers began segregating genera based on ascospore characteristics, leading to the recognition of distinct groups like Physcia and Xanthoria. The most dramatic period of generic splitting occurred in the 1970s and 1980s, when Mason Hale and others proposed numerous new genera based primarily on morphological features such as lobe shapes, rhizine types, and cortical chemistry.

The advent of molecular phylogenetics techniques in the late 1990s provided new tools for evaluating which morphological and chemical characters were most reliable for defining genera. These studies led to significant refinements in generic concepts, supporting some previously proposed splits while showing others to be artificial. For example, molecular data revealed that the brown-fruited genus Neofuscelia needed to be merged into Xanthoparmelia, while confirming that groups like Parmotrema and Cetrelia represented distinct evolutionary lineages.

Current understanding of generic relationships in Parmeliaceae emphasises the importance of reproductive characters over vegetative features. Characters of the ascomata (especially exciple anatomy and ascospore characteristics), conidial types, and cell wall polysaccharides have proven particularly valuable for defining natural groups. In contrast, some previously emphasised features such as thallus growth form and the presence of specific cortical substances have been shown to be more variable within lineages than previously thought.

Modern molecular studies have established that approximately 75% of Parmeliaceae species belong to well-defined major clades, including groups like Xanthoparmelia, Parmotrema, and their close relatives. The relationships among the remaining genera continue to be refined through ongoing research. Rather than being defined by single diagnostic features, most genera are now recognised as monophyletic groups characterised by unique combinations of multiple morphological, chemical, and anatomical traits.

== Evolutionary history ==
Although fossil records of extant lichen species are scarce, the existence of some amber inclusions has allowed for a rough estimate of the divergence of the Parmeliaceae from its most recent common ancestor. An Anzia inclusion from 35 to 40 Myr-old Baltic amber and Parmelia from 15 to 45 Myr-old Dominican amber suggest a minimum age estimate for the Parmeliaceae of about 40 Myr. A fossil-calibrated phylogeny has estimated the Parmeliaceae to have diversified much earlier, around the Cretaceous–Paleogene boundary, 58–74 Myr ago.

== Diversification ==
Time-calibrated analyses recover Parmeliaceae as a younger lineage with comparatively high speciation rates since its origin of about 102 Myr, with a marked family-wide upturn during the late Oligocene (approximately 20–25 Myr). That increase coincides with climatic warming in the same interval and the early radiations of the large macrolichen genera Usnea and Xanthoparmelia. Across the tree, most elevated rates and the three major inferred rate shifts are concentrated in lineages younger than ~30 Myr, including Usnea, Bryoria, Hypogymnia, Hypotrachyna, Xanthoparmelia, Flavoparmelia and Parmotrema; Usnea and Xanthoparmelia show speciation rates about two to three times the family average, disproportionately contributing to overall diversity.

Cohort analyses indicate fewer diversification regimes in Parmeliaceae than in Graphidaceae (another large lichen-forming fungal family), but the apparent homogeneity may be an artefact of the exceptionally rapid radiations of Usnea and Xanthoparmelia. Differences among clades are consistent with habitat-linked processes rather than a single family-wide driver: the fastest-diversifying genera appear to have evolved strategies that allow use of a broader range of habitats, which would help explain their elevated rates relative to the rest of the family.

== Characteristics ==
=== Thallus ===
Parmeliaceae thalli are most often foliose, fruticose or subfruticose, but can be umblicate, peltate, caespitose, crustose, or subcrustose. Two genera, Nesolechia and Raesaenenia, contain lichenicolous fungi. They can be a variety of colours, from whitish to grey, green to yellow, or brown to blackish (or any combination therein). Many genera are lobe forming, and nearly all are heteromerous (which are corticate on both sides). Species are usually rhizinate on the lower surface, occasionally with holdfasts, rhizohyphae, or a hypothallus. Only a few genera have a naked lower surface (for example Usnea, Hypogymnia and Menegazzia). The upper surface has a pored or non-pored epicortex. Medulla is solid, but often loosely woven.

=== Apothecia ===
Apothecia are lecanorine, produced along the lamina or margin, and sessile to pedicellate (or less often sunken). Thalline exciple is concolorous with the thallus. Asci are amyloid, and the vast majority of species have eight spores per ascus, though a few species are many-spored, and several Menegazzia species have two spores per ascus.

=== Spores ===
Ascospores are simple, hyaline, and often small. Conidia generally arise laterally from the joints of conidiogenous hyphae (Parmelia-type), but arise terminally from these joints in a small number of species (Psora-type). The conidia can have a broad range of shapes: cylindrical to bacilliform, bifusiform, fusiform, sublageniform, unciform, filiform, or curved. Pycnidia are immersed or rarely emergent from the upper cortex, are produced along the lamina or margins, pyriform in shape, and dark-brown to black in colour.

=== Chemistry ===
Members of the Parmeliaceae exhibit a diverse chemistry, with several types of lichenan (Xanthoparmelia-type, Cetraria-type, intermediate-type), isolichenan and/or other polysaccharides being known from the cell walls of many species. The wide diversity in the types of chemical compounds includes depsides, depsidones, aliphatic acids, triterpenes, anthraquinones, secalonic acids, pulvinic acid derivatives, and xanthones. The compounds usnic acid and atranorin, which are found exclusively in the Parmeliaceae, are of great importance in the systematics of the family, and the presence or absence of these chemicals have been used in several instances to help define genera. Parmelia and Usnea are the best chemically characterized genera, while the species Cetraria islandica and Evernia prunastri have attracted considerable research attention for their bioactive compounds.

A study of three parmelioid lichens (Bulbothrix setschwanensis, Hypotrachyna cirrhata, and Parmotrema reticulatum) collected from high-altitude areas of Garhwal Himalaya, showed considerable variation in the chemical content with the rising altitude. This suggests that there is a prominent role for secondary metabolites in the wider ecological distribution of Parmelioid lichens at higher altitudes.

=== Photobiont ===
The main photobiont genus that associates with Parmeliaceae species is the chlorophyte Trebouxia. In particular, the species Trebouxia jamesii appears to be especially prominent. Some Parmeliaceae genera are also known to associate with Asterochloris, but the frequency of this association is not yet known. In general, photobiont diversity within the Parmeliaceae is a little studied subject, and much is left to discover here.

== Genera ==
These are the genera that are in the Parmeliaceae (including estimated number of species in each genus). Following the genus name is the taxonomic authority (those who first circumscribed the genus; standardised author abbreviations are used), year of publication, and the estimated number of species.

- Ahtiana Goward (1986) – 1 sp.
- Alectoria Ach. (1809) – 9 spp.
- Allantoparmelia (Vain.) Essl. (1978) – 3 spp.
- Allocetraria Kurok. & M.J.Lai (1991) – 12 spp.
- Anzia Stizenb. (1861) – 34 spp.
- Arctocetraria Kärnefelt & A.Thell (1993)
- Arctoparmelia Hale (1986) – 5 spp.
- Asahinea W.L.Culb. & C.F.Culb. (1965) – 2 spp.
- Austromelanelixia Divakar, A.Crespo & Lumbsch (2017) – 5 spp.
- Austroparmelina A.Crespo, Divakar & Elix (2010) – 13 spp.
- Brodoa Goward (1987) – 3 spp.
- Bryocaulon Kärnefelt (1986) – 4 spp.
- Bryoria Brodo & D.Hawksw. (1977)
- Bulborrhizina Kurok. (1994) – 1 sp.
- Bulbothrix Hale (1974) – 62
- Canoparmelia Elix & Hale (1986) – 35 spp.
- Cetraria Ach. (1803) – 35 spp.
- Cetrariella Kärnefelt & A.Thell (1993) – 3 spp.
- Cetrariopsis Kurok. (1980) – 3 spp.
- Cetrelia W.L.Culb. & C.F.Culb. (1968) – 19 spp.
- Coelopogon Brusse & Kärnefelt (1968) – 2 spp.
- Cladocetraria Chesnokov, Prokopiev & Konoreva (2023) – 1 sp.
- Cornicularia (Schreb.) Ach. (1803) – 1 sp.
- Crespoa (D.Hawksw.) Lendemer & B.P.Hodk. (2013) – 5 spp.
- Dactylina Nyl. (1860) – 2 spp.
- Davidgallowaya Aptroot (2007) – 1 sp.
- Dolichousnea (Y.Ohmura) Articus (2004) – 3 spp.
- Emodomelanelia Divakar & A.Crespo (2010) – 1 sp.
- Esslingeriana Hale & M.J.Lai (1980) – 1 sp.
- Evernia Ach. (1809) – 10 spp.
- Everniopsis Nyl. (1860) – 1 sp.
- Flavocetraria Kärnefelt & A.Thell (1994) – 1 spp.
- Flavocetrariella D.D.Awasthi (2007)
- Flavoparmelia Hale (1986) – 32 spp.
- Flavopunctelia Hale (1984) – 5 spp.
- Gowardia Halonen, Myllys, Velmala & Hyvärinen (2009) – 3 spp.
- Himantormia I.M.Lamb (1964) – 2 spp.
- Hypogymnia (Nyl.) Nyl. (1896) – 90 spp.
- Hypotrachyna (Vain.) Hale (1974) – 262 spp.
- Imshaugia S.L.F.Mey. (1985) – 1 sp.
- Kaernefeltia A.Thell & Goward (1996) – 3 spp.
- Letharia (Th.Fr.) Zahlbr. (1892) – 9 spp.
- Lethariella (Motyka) Krog (1976) – 11 spp.
- Maronina Hafellner & R.W.Rogers (1990) – 3 spp.
- Masonhalea Kärnefelt (1977) – 2 spp.
- Melanelia Essl. (1978) – 2 spp.
- Melanelixia O.Blanco, A.Crespo, Divakar, Essl., D.Hawksw. & Lumbsch (2004) – 11 spp.
- Melanohalea O.Blanco, A.Crespo, Divakar, Essl., D.Hawksw. & Lumbsch (2004) – 22 spp.
- Menegazzia A.Massal. (1854) – 70 spp.
- Montanelia Divakar, A.Crespo, Wedin & Essl. (2012) – 5 spp.
- Myelochroa (Asahina) Elix & Hale (1987) – 30 spp.
- Neoprotoparmelia Garima Singh, Lumbsch & I.Schmitt (2018) – 14 spp.
- Nephromopsis Müll.Arg. (1891) – 62 spp.?
- Nesolechia A.Massal. (1856) – 2 spp.
- Nipponoparmelia (Kurok.) K.H.Moon, Y.Ohmura & Kashiw. (2010) – 4 spp.
- Nodobryoria Common & Brodo (1995) – 3 spp.
- Notoparmelia A.Crespo, Ferencová & Divakar (2014) – 16 spp.
- Omphalodium Meyen & Flot. (1843) – 4 spp.
- Omphalora T.H.Nash & Hafellner (1990) – 1 sp.
- Oropogon Th.Fr. (1861) – 42 spp.
- Pannoparmelia (Müll.Arg.) Darb. (1912) – 5 spp.
- Parmelia Ach. (1803) – 43 spp.
- Parmelina Hale (1974) – 10 spp.
- Parmelinella Elix & Hale (1987) – 8 spp.
- Parmeliopsis (Nyl.) Nyl. (1863) – 3 spp.
- Parmotrema A.Massal. (1860) – 255 spp.
- Parmotremopsis Elix & Hale (1987) – 2 spp
- Phacopsis Tul. (1852) – 10 spp.
- Platismatia W.L.Culb. & C.F.Culb. (1968) – 11 spp.
- Pleurosticta Petr. (1931) – 2 spp.
- Protoparmelia M.Choisy (1929) – 11 spp.
- Protousnea (Motyka) Krog (1976) – 8 spp.
- Pseudephebe M.Choisy (1930) – 2 spp.
- Pseudevernia Zopf (1903) – 4 spp.
- Pseudoparmelia Lynge (1914) – 15 spp.
- Psiloparmelia Hale (1989) – 13 spp.
- Punctelia Krog (1982) – 48 spp.
- Relicina (Hale & Kurok.) Hale (1974) – 59 spp.
- Remototrachyna Divakar & A.Crespo (2010) – 19 spp.
- Raesaenenia D.Hawksw., Boluda & H.Lindgr. (2015) – 1 sp.
- Sulcaria Bystr. (1971) – 5 spp.
- Tuckermanella Essl. (2003) – 7 spp.
- Tuckermannopsis Gyeln. (1933) – 12 spp.
- Tuckneraria Randlane & A.Thell (1994) – 3 spp.
- Usnea Dill. ex Adans. (1763) – 355 spp.
- Usnocetraria M.J.Lai & J.C.Wei (2007) – 2 spp.
- Vulpicida J.-E.Mattsson & M.J.Lai (1993) – 6 spp.
- Xanthoparmelia (Vain.) Hale (1974) – 822 spp.

A genus Foveolaria Chesnokov, Prokopiev, Konoreva & Davydov was proposed in 2023 to contain the species historically known as Cetraria nivalis and transferred to several genera (including Allocetraria, Flavocetraria, and Nephromopsis), but this naming proposal was not valid, as the name has already been used for a plant genus; its current taxonomic status is unclear.

== Conservation ==
Parmeliaceae species that have been assessed for the global IUCN Red List include the following: Anzia centrifuga (vulnerable, 2014); Sulcaria badia (endangered, 2019); Lethariella togashii (vulnerable, 2017); Hypotrachyna virginica (critically endangered, 2020); Sulcaria isidiifera (critically endangered, 2017); Sulcaria spiralifera (endangered, 2020); and Xanthoparmelia beccae (vulnerable, 2017).

== Image gallery ==
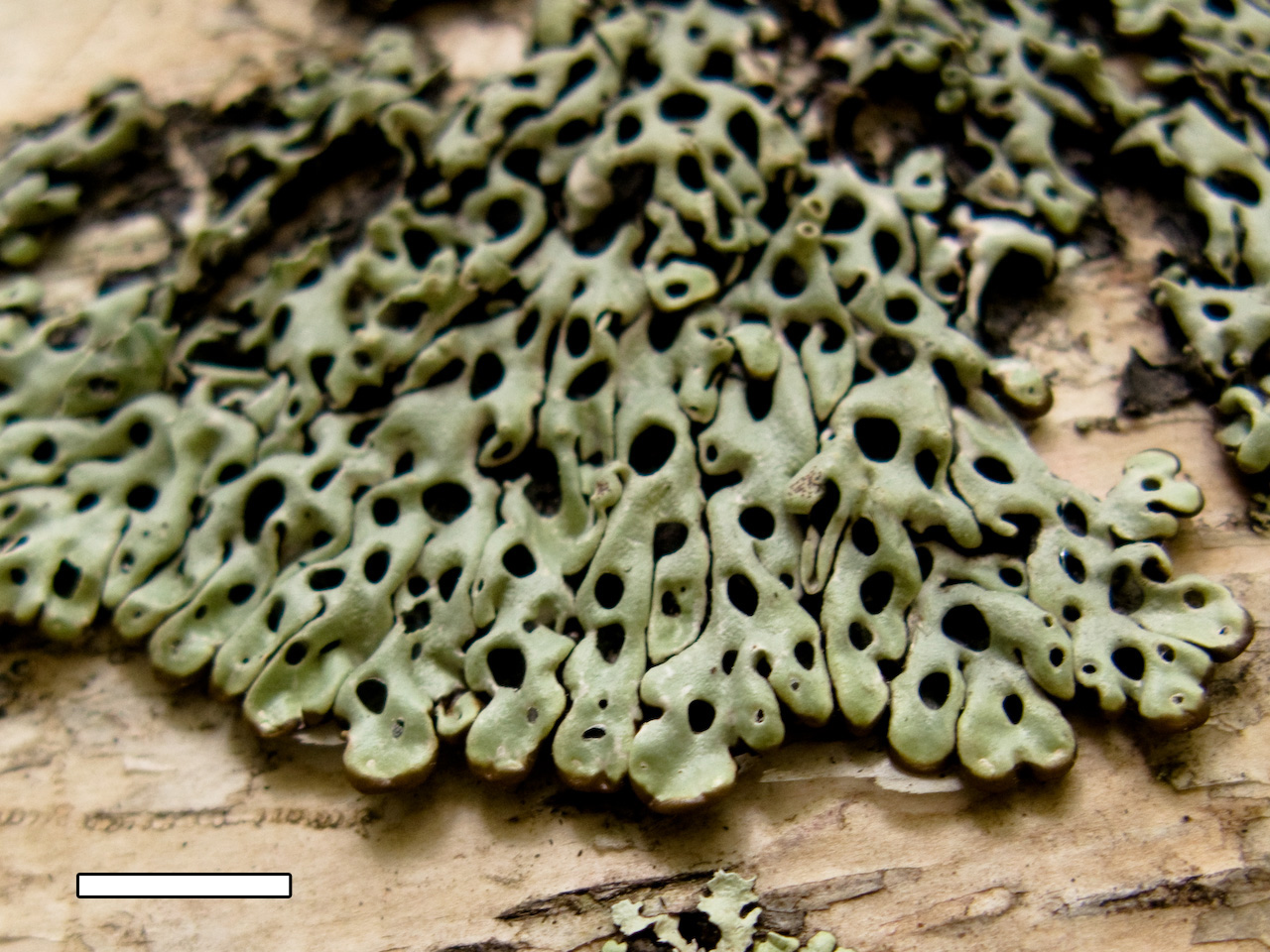
Menegazzia pertransita growing on a tree in New Zealand. Scale bar = 1 cm.

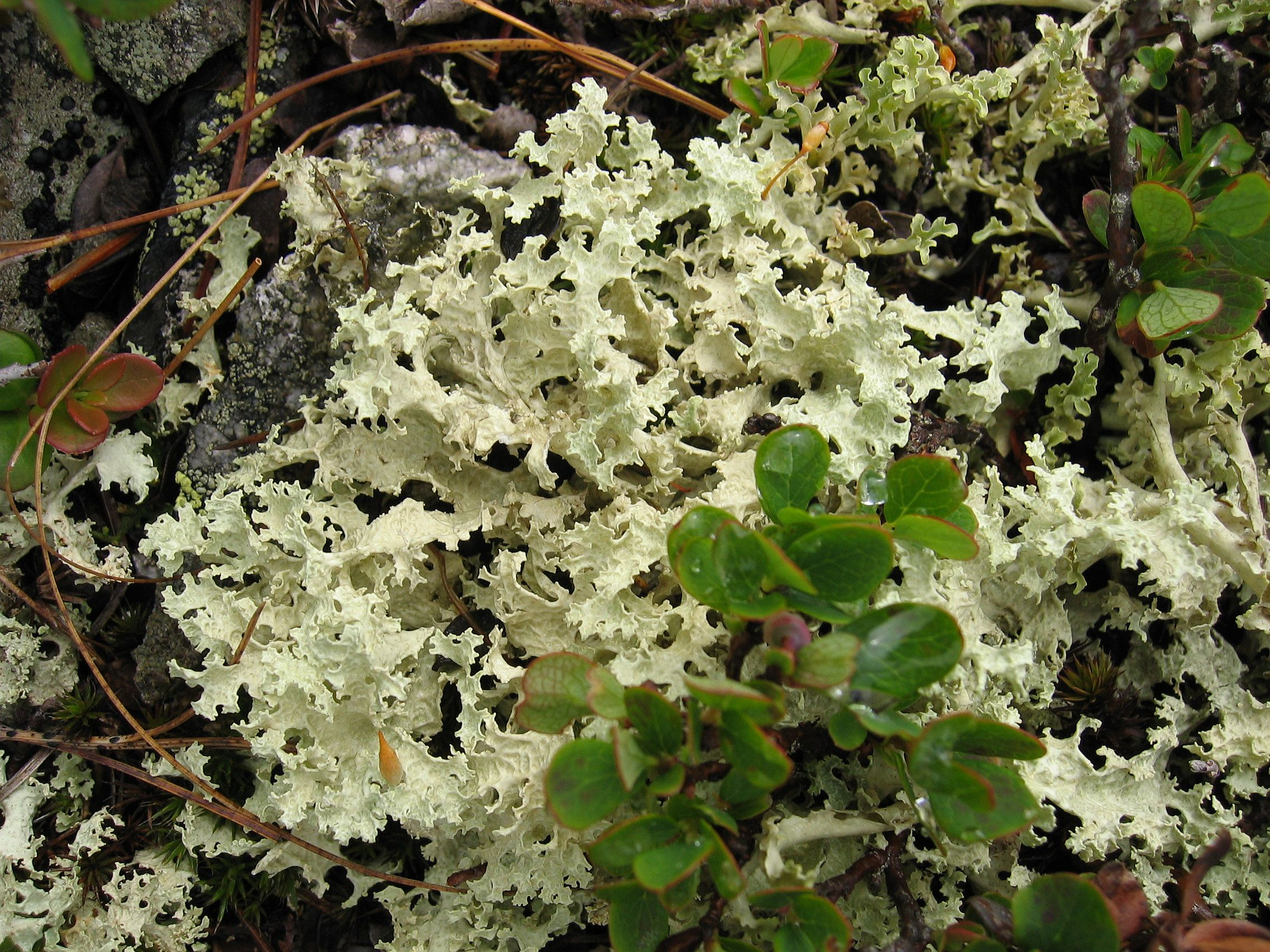
Cetraria nivalis from Austria.

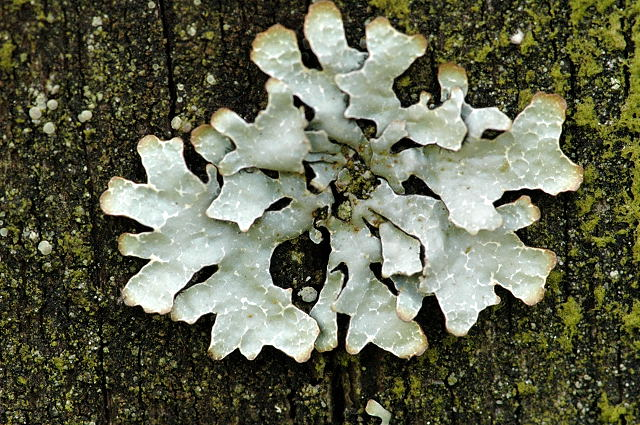
Parmelia sulcata from Commanster, Belgium.

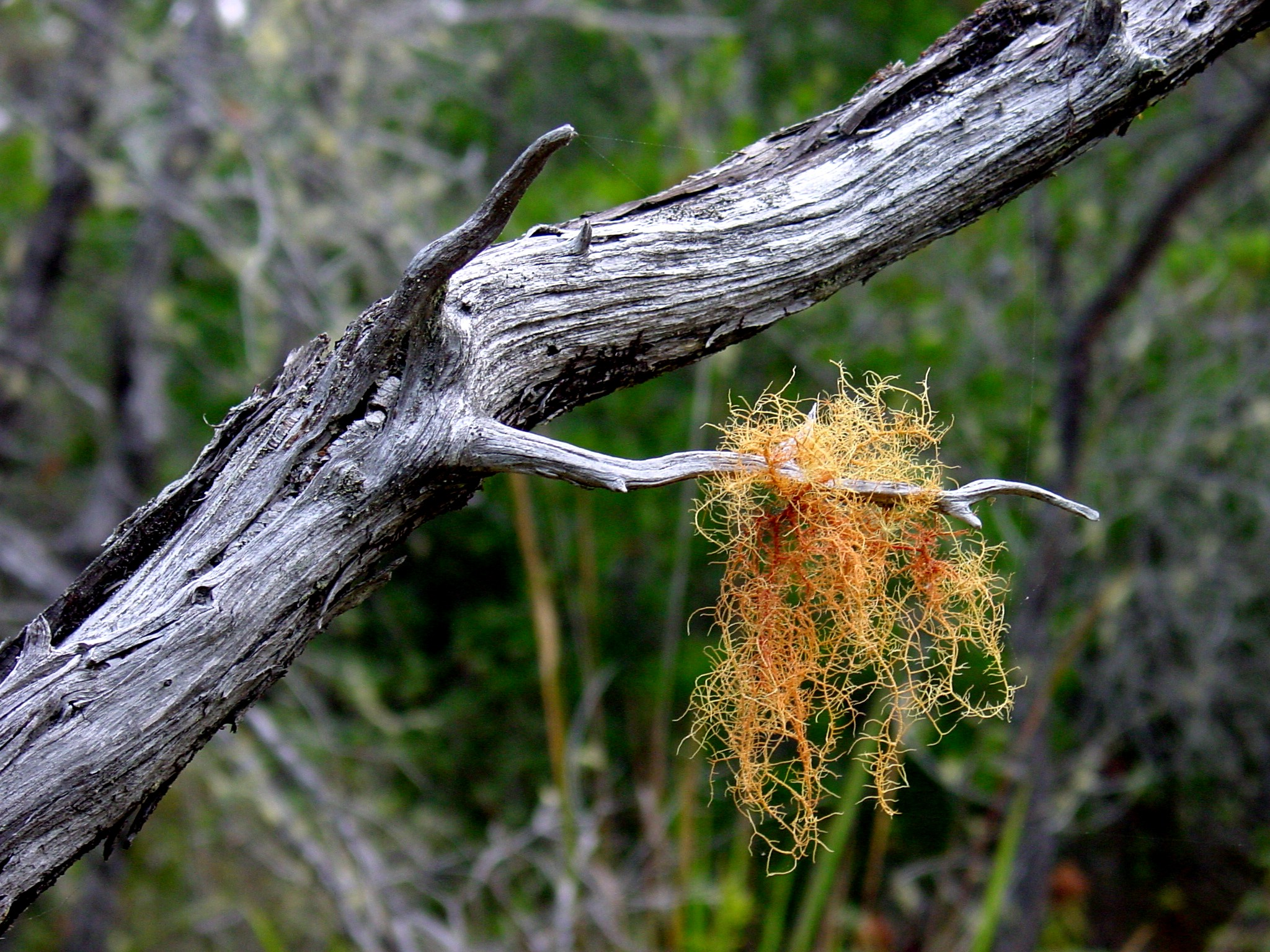
Usnea rubicunda growing on a branch in Mendocino County, California.

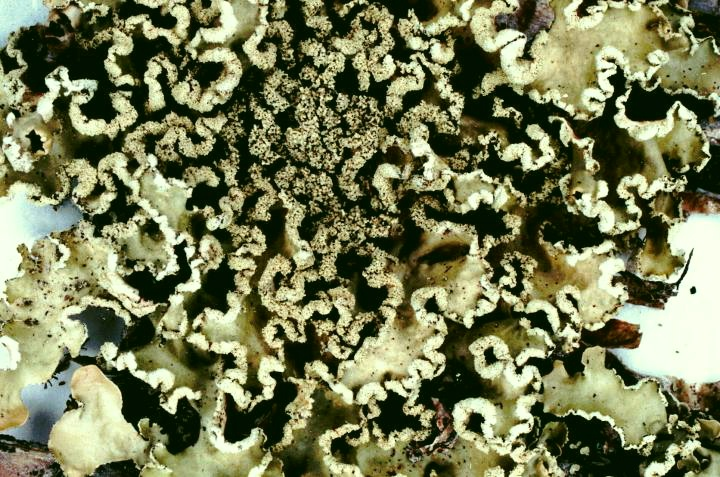
Allocetraria oakesiana growing on bark in Highland County, Virginia.

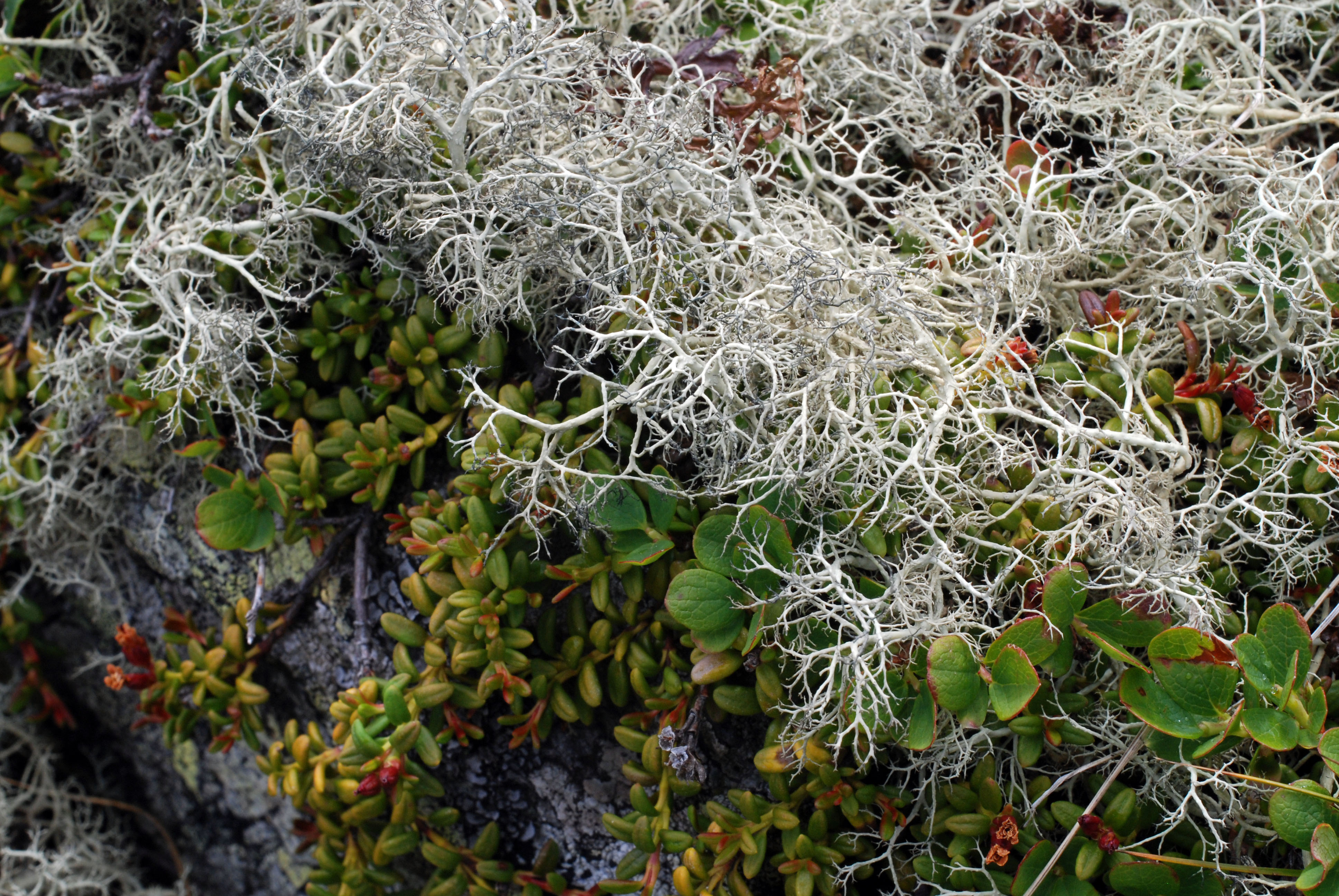
Alectoria ochroleuca from Carianthia, Austria.

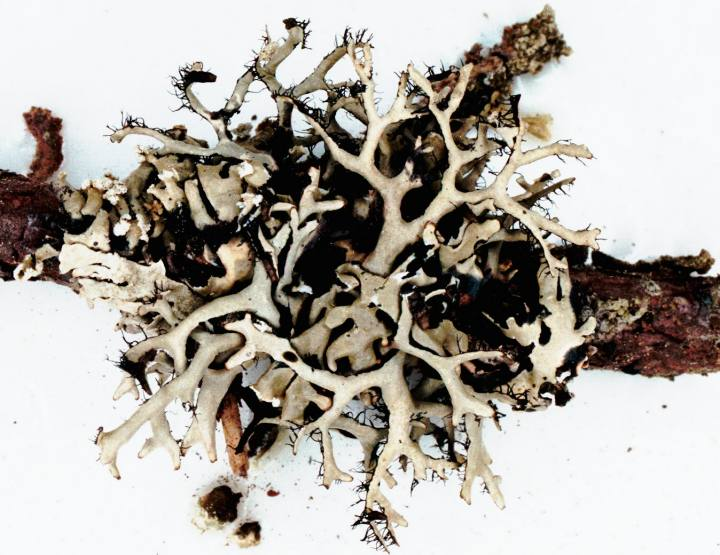
Hypotrachyna catawbiensis from Steuben, Maine.

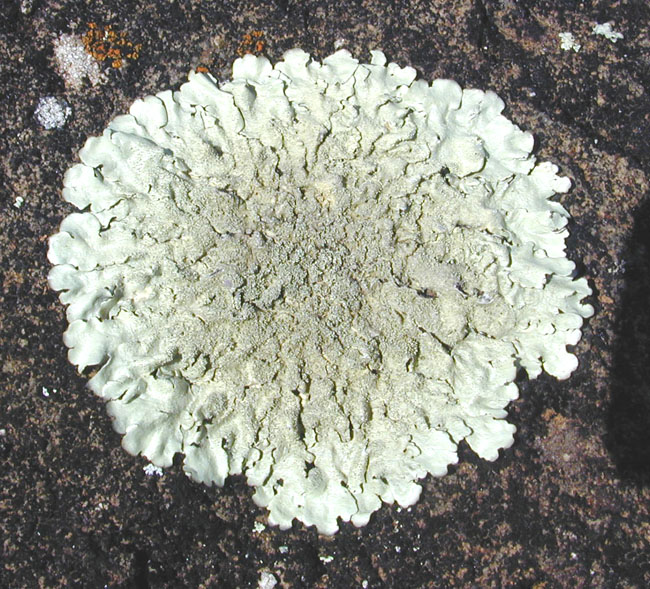
Xanthoparmelia cf. lavicola, on basalt in Hawaii.

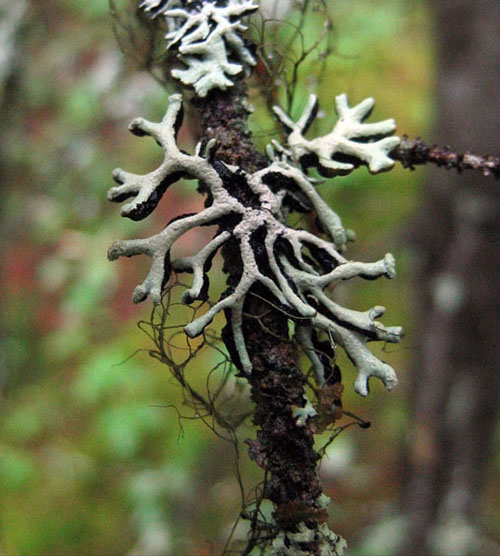
Hypogymnia cf. tubulosa in Alberta, Canada.

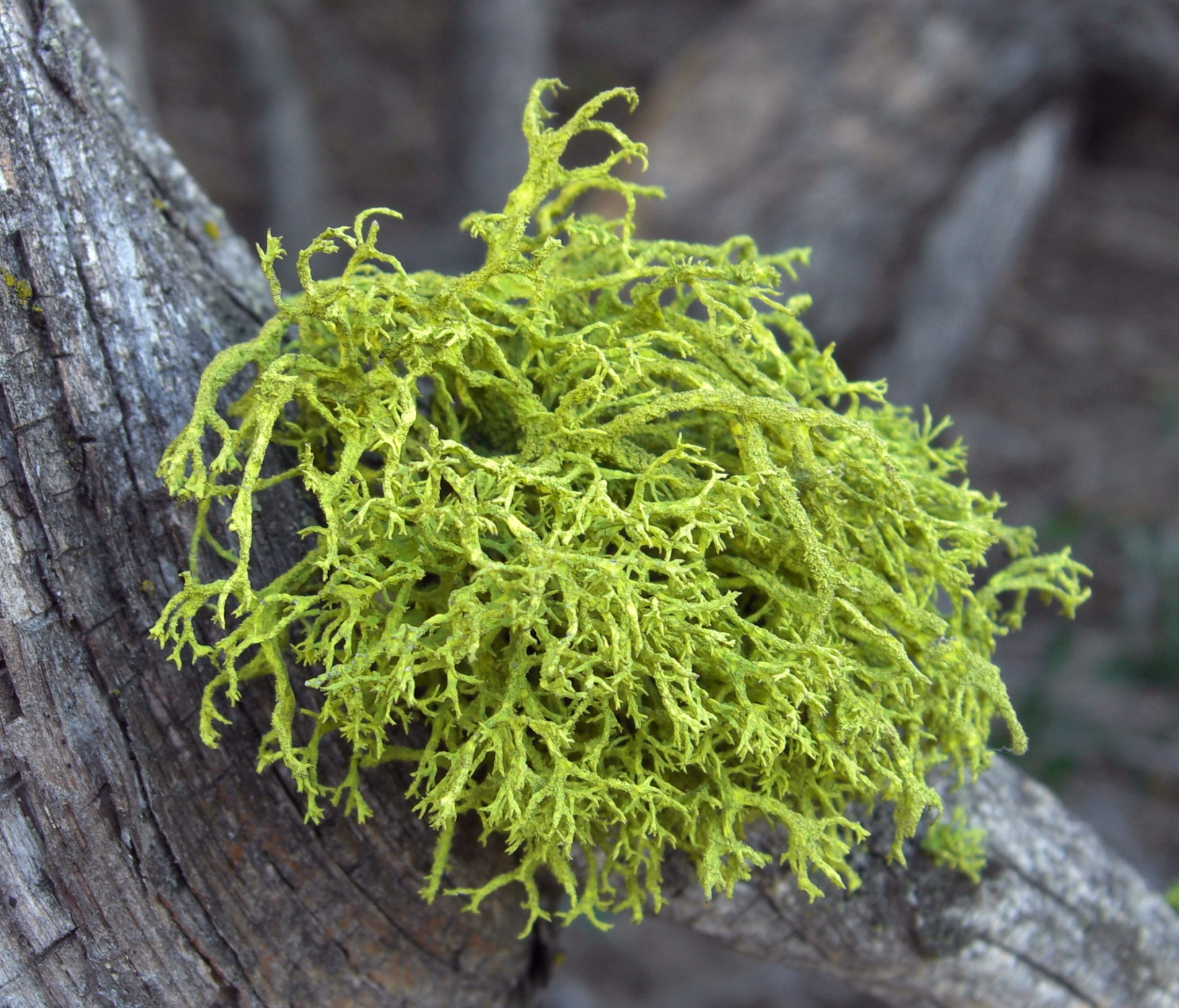
Letharia vulpina at Mt. Gleason, California.
