= Montanelia occultipanniformis =

Scientific classification
- Kingdom: Fungi
- Division: Ascomycota
- Class: Lecanoromycetes
- Order: Lecanorales
- Family: Parmeliaceae
- Genus: Montanelia
- Species: M. occultipanniformis

Binomial name
- Montanelia occultipanniformis S.D.Leav., Essl., Divakar, A.Crespo & Lumbsch (2016)
- Type locality: Tsarskaya Doroga, Russian Far East

Species of lichen-forming fungus

Montanelia occultipanniformis is a species of foliose lichen in the family Parmeliaceae. It was formally described in 2016 based on molecular evidence that distinguished it from the morphologically similar Montanelia panniformis. As a cryptic species, it cannot be reliably identified by appearance alone and requires DNA sequencing for confident determination. The species is known from disjunct populations in Interior Alaska and the Russian Far East.

== Taxonomy ==
Montanelia occultipanniformis was described as a new species in 2016 by Steven Leavitt, Theodore Esslinger, Pradeep Divakar, Ana Crespo, and H. Thorsten Lumbsch, in a study of cryptic "camouflage" lichens in the family Parmeliaceae. The species epithet alludes to its "hidden" status within material traditionally treated as Montanelia panniformis. The type was collected in the Russian Far East (Khabarovsk Krai, Bureinskiy Zapovednik, upper Pravaya Bureya River area), where it was found on a log in talus at about 900 m elevation; the holotype is specimen 'Spribille 31832', housed in the herbarium of the University of Graz (GZU).

In the authors' phylogenetic framework, the species corresponds to specimens recovered in a distinct lineage (their clade named "M. panniformis A"), and it was diagnosed from M. panniformis (in the strict sense, or sensu stricto) using fixed nucleotide differences in the fungal internal transcribed spacer (ITS) barcode region, with additional support from coalescent-based analyses of multiple genetic loci. They also reported that no consistent morphological, chemical, or geographic traits had yet been found that cleanly separate it from M. panniformis as traditionally circumscribed, although the two sampled specimens fell at one end of the variation in that complex.

== Description ==
As presently characterized in the original description, M. occultipanniformis is essentially a cryptic member of the Montanelia panniformis complex: it is morphologically similar to M. panniformis and, on current evidence, cannot be reliably identified by appearance alone. The authors observed that the two sequenced specimens had very narrow, elongate, and fairly regular "isidioid lobules" (small, isidia-like outgrowths), but they treated this as falling within the broader range of variation that has historically been placed under M. panniformis.

Chemically, they reported it to be indistinguishable from M. panniformis sensu stricto, with both producing the secondary metabolites (lichen products) perlatolic acid and stenosporic acid. In practice, that means confident separation depends on molecular data (fixed ITS differences), rather than routine morphology or chemistry.

== Habitat and distribution ==
Based on the material available to the describing authors, M. occultipanniformis was known from only two widely separated ("disjunct") populations: one in Interior Alaska (Denali National Park and Preserve) and one in the Russian Far East (Khabarovsk Krai). The two known collections were reported from different substrates, with one gathered on rock and the other on wood (lignum). The type locality in Russia is a montane setting (about 901 m), where it was found growing on a log in talus.

The authors emphasized that additional sampling of M. panniformis-like material will be needed to clarify whether any consistent field characters can be used to separate M. occultipanniformis from M. panniformis sensu stricto, and they noted that populations reported from mountains in Venezuela and central Chile had not yet been included in molecular phylogenetic studies.
