= Montanelia predisjuncta =

Scientific classification
- Kingdom: Fungi
- Division: Ascomycota
- Class: Lecanoromycetes
- Order: Lecanorales
- Family: Parmeliaceae
- Genus: Montanelia
- Species: M. predisjuncta

Binomial name
- Montanelia predisjuncta (Essl.) Divakar, A.Crespo, Wedin & Essl. (2012)

Synonyms
- Parmelia predisjuncta Essl. (1977); Melanelia predisjuncta (Essl.) Essl. (1978)

Species of lichen-forming fungus

Montanelia predisjuncta is a species of saxicolous (rock-dwelling) foliose lichen in the family Parmeliaceae. The lichen forms small rosettes of narrow, olive-brown to dark brown lobes that grow tightly pressed against rock surfaces in mountainous areas. It was originally described from Japan and has since been recorded from China and Russia, though some genetic studies suggest it may not be distinct from the more widespread Montanelia disjuncta. The species is characterized by its lack of powdery or granular reproductive structures, the presence of irregular pale markings on its upper surface, and its production of perlatolic and stenosporonic acids.

== Taxonomy ==
Montanelia predisjuncta was described in 1977 by Theodore Lee Esslinger as Parmelia predisjuncta, based on saxicolous material collected on rock from Azusayama in central Japan (Shinano Province) at 1,400–1,500 m elevation. In the protologue, it was presented as closely related to P. disjuncta but consistently lacking soredia and containing perlatolic and stenosporonic acids. Esslinger also argued that it should not be treated as a "species pair" with P. disjuncta because the two differ in several additional characters. He reported that it had sometimes been mistaken for P. stygia, but separated it by differences in pseudocyphellae and by secondary chemistry, noting that the chemical races of P. stygia did not match P. predisjuncta in containing depsides.

The species was later treated in Melanelia as Melanelia predisjuncta. Divakar and co-authors segregated the Melanelia disjuncta group as the genus Montanelia using multilocus phylogenetic analyses supported by morphology and chemistry, and they made the new combination Montanelia predisjuncta. In that circumscription, Montanelia is characterised by narrow lobes, a non-pored epicortex, flat effigurate pseudocyphellae, and orcinol depsides in the medulla (including perlatolic and stenosporic acids). Divakar and co-authors cautioned that species limits in the genus need further study because some named taxa in the group were not recovered as monophyletic in their sampling. A later multilocus study sampled one specimen identified as M. predisjuncta from the type locality and recovered it inside the M. disjuncta clade, so their sequence data did not support M. predisjuncta as a distinct lineage in that data set. On that basis, Leavitt and co-authors suggested it may be synonymous with the widespread M. disjuncta, while noting that formal taxonomic changes would require broader population sampling.

== Description ==
The thallus of M. predisjuncta is foliose and typically sits closely appressed to the substrate, sometimes becoming more cushion-like as the lobes overlap. Individual thalli are about 2–6 cm across, and neighbouring thalli may merge into larger patches. Lobes are narrow (usually 0.4–0.8 mm wide), mostly linear, and can become irregularly overlapping or entangled. The upper surface is olive-brown to dark brown or black-brown, with the margins often smoother and the inner parts more rugose or pitted. The thallus lacks both soredia and isidia. Pseudocyphellae are present and may be few to numerous, occurring mainly near the lobe margins and sometimes across the upper surface, with an irregular outline. The lower surface is black and mostly flat to slightly channelled, with a dull finish and moderate rhizine development.

Apothecia (fruiting bodies) are often produced, and are sessile to short-stipitate, becoming flatter or slightly convex with age and reaching up to about 4 mm in diameter. Ascospores are eight per ascus, ellipsoid to ovoid, and about 9–12 × 5–7 μm. Pycnidia are common, producing slender conidia about 4.5–7 × about 1 μm. Spot tests are negative in both cortex (K−, HNO_{3}−) and medulla (PD−, K−, C−, KC−). The secondary metabolites are perlatolic acid and stenosporonic acid.

== Habitat and distribution ==
Montanelia predisjuncta is a saxicolous mountain lichen known from Japan, China, and Russia. The type was collected from Azusayama in Shinano Province (central Japan) at 1,400–1,500 m, with additional specimens in the protologue from other Japanese mountain localities in Shinano, Shimotsuke, and Hidaka (including Mount Apoi). In the protologue it was stated to be known only from the mountains of Japan, in contrast to P. disjuncta, which was described as essentially circumboreal and not recorded from Japan.

Wang and co-authors reported Melanelia predisjuncta as new to China, based on a collection from Jilin (Mt Changbaishan) at about 1,900 m elevation, and also noted prior reports from Russia. Leavitt and co-authors included a specimen from the Japanese type locality in their sampling and likewise referred to reports from Russia and China. At the genus level, Montanelia is almost strictly saxicolous and occurs mainly in montane regions of the Northern Hemisphere and north into the Arctic. In their overview, Leavitt and co-authors characterized Montanelia as exclusively rock-dwelling, and M. predisjuncta was the only named species then considered restricted to Asia.
