= Montanelia secwepemc =

Scientific classification
- Kingdom: Fungi
- Division: Ascomycota
- Class: Lecanoromycetes
- Order: Lecanorales
- Family: Parmeliaceae
- Genus: Montanelia
- Species: M. secwepemc

Binomial name
- Montanelia secwepemc S.D.Leav., Essl., Divakar, A.Crespo & Lumbsch (2016)
- Type locality: 10 km west of Fort Fraser, British Columbia

Species of lichen-forming fungus

Montanelia secwepemc is a species of foliose lichen in the family Parmeliaceae. It is a brown, leaf-like lichen that grows on rock surfaces in northwestern North America, with confirmed records from British Columbia, Yukon, and Alaska. The species was described in 2016 and named in honour of the Secwépemc people of British Columbia. It closely resembles other members of the Montanelia tominii species complex and was distinguished primarily through DNA sequence data.

== Taxonomy ==
Montanelia secwepemc was described as a new species in 2016 by Steven Leavitt, Theodore Esslinger, Pradeep K. Divakar, Ana Crespo, and H. Thorsten Lumbsch. The species epithet honours the Secwépemc people of British Columbia. The type collection was made in British Columbia along Highway 16, about 10 km west of Fort Fraser, where it was found on a south-facing rock boulder beside the highway at roughly 738 m elevation (holotype: Esslinger 20208, deposited the herbarium of the Field Museum in Chicago).

The authors treated it as part of the Montanelia tominii species complex: specimens of M. secwepemc are morphologically similar to M. tominii but represent a distinct evolutionary lineage recovered in molecular phylogenetics analyses. In their diagnosis, M. secwepemc is separated from other lineages in the complex by a combination of characters, including an upper surface that lacks soredia, a North American distribution, and fixed differences in internal transcribed spacer (ITS) DNA sequences; it was also supported as distinct by coalescent-based analyses of multiple genetic loci.

== Description ==
This species belongs to a group of brown parmelioid lichens in which species can be difficult to distinguish using external features alone. In the original description, M. secwepemc is characterized as esorediate (lacking soredia) while remaining otherwise similar in overall appearance to M. tominii as traditionally interpreted.

Within North America, the most similar look-alike discussed by the authors is Montanelia saximontana; based on their current sampling, M. secwepemc differs by the absence of soralia (the structures that produce soredia). Because the diagnostic evidence emphasized in the paper includes fixed nucleotide differences in the fungal ITS barcode region, DNA sequence data are part of what can reliably separate this species from close relatives in the M. tominii complex.

== Habitat and distribution ==
Montanelia secwepemc is saxicolous: all sampled specimens were collected on rock. The type locality is in central British Columbia (west of Fort Fraser) on a south-facing roadside boulder.

As documented in the paper, the species is known from four sites in northwestern North America: one in British Columbia, two in Yukon, and one in Alaska. The authors stressed that broader sampling will be needed to confirm whether the absence of soredia remains consistent across its range and to better define its limits relative to the sorediate M. saximontana.
