= Montanelia saximontana =

Scientific classification
- Kingdom: Fungi
- Division: Ascomycota
- Class: Lecanoromycetes
- Order: Lecanorales
- Family: Parmeliaceae
- Genus: Montanelia
- Species: M. saximontana

Binomial name
- Montanelia saximontana (R.A.Anderson & W.A.Weber) S.D.Leav., Essl., Divakar, A.Crespo & Lumbsch (2016)

Synonyms
- Parmelia saximontana R.A.Anderson & W.A.Weber (1962)

Species of lichen-forming fungus

Montanelia saximontana is a species of foliose lichen in the family Parmeliaceae. It is characterized by its olive-brown, leafy growth form with powdery reproductive structures (soredia) and a black underside. The species grows on rocks and occasionally on tree bark across western North America, from British Columbia south to Arizona. Originally described from specimens collected in Colorado in 1962, it was transferred to its current genus in 2016 based on DNA evidence. It is closely related to the Asian species Montanelia tominii and can only be reliably distinguished from it using DNA sequences. Thalli can grow up to 15 cm (6 in) across, typically forming rosettes on rock surfaces.

== Taxonomy ==
Montanelia saximontana is the current name for a sorediate brown parmelioid lichen that was originally described as Parmelia saximontana by Roger A. Anderson and William A. Weber in 1962. The type was collected in Boulder County, Colorado, on Dakota Formation sandstone just northwest of Boulder at about 5,800 ft (1,800 m) on April 6, 1962 (Anderson & Weber L-30072, COLO). In 2016, Steven Leavitt and coauthors transferred the species to Montanelia, publishing the new combination Montanelia saximontana.

Leavitt and colleagues treated M. saximontana as part of the species complex centered around Montanelia tominii and diagnosed it using fixed differences in the fungal internal transcribed spacer (ITS) barcode region. They also reported that coalescent-based analyses of multiple genetic loci support it as a lineage distinct from all other sampled populations. Aside from DNA data and its distribution in western North America, they did not find stable morphological or chemical characters that consistently separate M. saximontana from Asian specimens traditionally placed in M. tominii in the loose sense (sensu lato). Based on their sampling, they suggested that M. tominii in the strict sense (sensu stricto) may be absent from western North America and that sorediate specimens previously identified as M. tominii there belong to M. saximontana.

== Description ==
The lichen forms a leafy (foliose) thallus with narrow, strap-like lobes, usually arranged as rounded rosettes that can reach about 15 cm (6 in) across and may merge into larger, irregular patches. The upper surface is light to dark olive-brown, sometimes becoming nearly blackish, and it is dotted with tiny pinhole-like breaks (pseudocyphellae) that can later open into cap-like powdery structures (capitate soralia) that produce soredia. The lobes are often crowded and overlapping toward the center but become more distinct near the margins, where they may broaden and branch into smaller lobules. The lower surface is black, with a brown edge, and it is attached by coarse, mostly simple or forked rhizines that can be up to about 1.2 mm long.

Apothecia (fruiting bodies) are often present, reaching up to about 7 mm (0.3 in) across, with a red-brown to dark brown-black disk and a thallus-colored margin that may develop soralia or become covered in soredia. The ascospores are ellipsoid and typically measure about 8–11 × 4–6.5 μm, and pycnidia were reported as uncommon, producing slender, colorless conidia about 5–8 × 0.8–1.5 μm. Standard spot tests reactions include a usually negative K reaction and a C reaction that is sometimes rose-pink in the cortex and rose-pink in the medulla, consistent with the presence of gyrophoric acid. In a modern molecular context, Leavitt and coworkers emphasized that North American sorediate material matching the type concept is best treated as M. saximontana, even when it is otherwise difficult to separate from Asian M. tominii-like specimens using appearance alone.

== Habitat and distribution ==
In the original description, the species was primarily saxicolous and recorded from a wide range of rock types, including rhyolite, granite, gneiss, schist, noncalcareous to somewhat calcareous sandstones and conglomerates, and even strongly calcareous red shale. It can partly overgrow moss mats, and at and near the type locality it was also found occasionally on bark and wood of Douglas-fir (Pseudotsuga menziesii) and ponderosa pine (Pinus ponderosa), with one record from juniper wood. In the Colorado Front Range, Anderson and Weber reported that it overlaps altitudinally with Montanelia disjuncta from about 6,000 to 10,000 ft (1,800 to 3,000 m), with M. disjuncta more frequent above 10,000 ft and M. saximontana more frequent below 6,000 ft. They also noted substantial variation in growth form (from tightly appressed, densely imbricate (overlapping) thalli to more open, flattened, branched thalli) and interpreted this as environmental variation rather than taxonomically meaningful differences.

Anderson and Weber reported it from multiple western U.S. states, including Arizona, Colorado, Montana, New Mexico, South Dakota, and Utah, based on a large series of collections assembled since 1950. In Leavitt and coworkers' revision, M. saximontana was treated as restricted to western North America and supported as a distinct lineage using ITS sequence characters and multilocus analyses. Their examined material included collections from British Columbia, Canada, as well as U.S. collections from California, Montana, New Mexico, and Utah; it was later recorded from Nevada. They further indicated that sorediate specimens in western North America previously identified as M. tominii should be referred to M. saximontana on current evidence.
