= Aleksandr Fomin =

Aleksandr Fomin may refer to:

- Aleksandr Fomin (botanist) (1869–1935), Russian/Soviet botanist and academician
- Aleksandr Fomin, alias of Soviet spy Alexander Feklisov (1914–2007)
