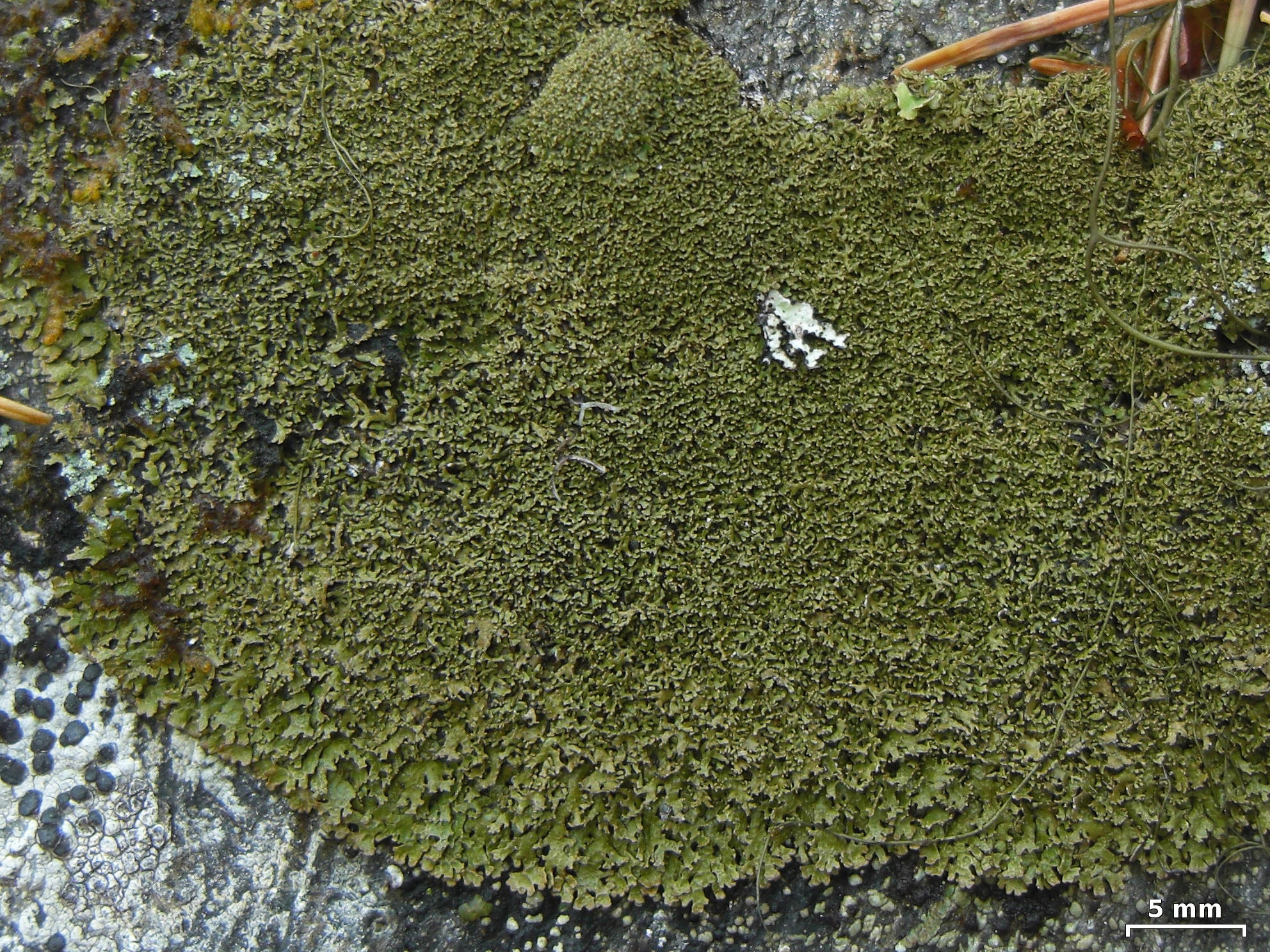
- Montanelia panniformis

Scientific classification
- Kingdom: Fungi
- Division: Ascomycota
- Class: Lecanoromycetes
- Order: Lecanorales
- Family: Parmeliaceae
- Genus: Montanelia; Divakar, A.Crespo, Wedin & Essl. (2012)

Type species
- Montanelia panniformis (Nyl.) Divakar, A.Crespo, Wedin & Essl. (2012)

= Montanelia =

Genus of lichen-forming fungi

Montanelia is a genus of lichen-forming fungi belonging to the large family Parmeliaceae. The genus comprises foliose lichens recognised by its short, narrow lobes with flat to slightly convex edges; a smooth, unperforated outer skin (epicortex); shallow, irregular pseudocyphellae—tiny pores—on the upper surface; slender, cylindrical to spindle-shaped asexual spores (conidia); and a white medulla that contains orcinol depsides.

== Taxonomy ==
Montanelia was circumscribed in 2012 by Pradeep K. Divakar, Ana Crespo, Mats Wedin, and Ted Esslinger in 2012 to accommodate a group of five species previously assigned to the genus Melanelia. The genus name combines "montane", referring to its montane distribution, with -elia alluding to the genus Melanelia.

Molecular phylogenetics work that sampled all recognised species showed that Montanelia predisjuncta nests firmly inside the M. disjuncta clade. Because no genetic discontinuity was detected between them, the authors concluded that M. predisjuncta is best treated as a synonym of M. disjuncta.

A rate-calibrated species tree based on six nuclear and mitochondrial loci dates the origin of the genus to about 23 million years ago (early Miocene). Most diversification occurred through the Miocene and Pliocene, with a more recent burst of speciation during the Pleistocene that is especially evident in the M. tominii complex.

A follow-up revision in 2016 formally recognised three of those cryptic lineages—Montanelia occultipanniformis sp. nov., M. secwepemc sp. nov. and M. saximontana (raised from variety to species rank)—and treated M. predisjuncta as a possible synonym of M. disjuncta, basing the decision on six-locus coalescent species-delimitation analyses and diagnostic ITS barcodes.

== Description ==
The foliose thallus forms mats that sit loosely to moderately tight against the substrate, occasionally bulging into a low cushion. Lobes are narrow and more or less linear, only 0.4–3 mm wide; their tips lie flat to gently rounded and never develop the long marginal hairs (cilia) seen in some other brown Parmeliaceae. The upper surface varies from tan to dark brown-black, with a texture that is smooth near the tips but often finely wrinkled toward the centre. It lacks spots or stains and is commonly broken by tiny, pale pores (pseudocyphellae), except in M. sorediata (where they are absent) and only occasionally in M. panniformis. These pores are flush with the surface and have no fixed outline. A non-pored epicortex overlies the cellular upper cortex. Beneath, the medulla is white, while the lower surface is black—grading to dark brown at the margin—and bears short, unbranched rhizines of the same colour that anchor the thallus.

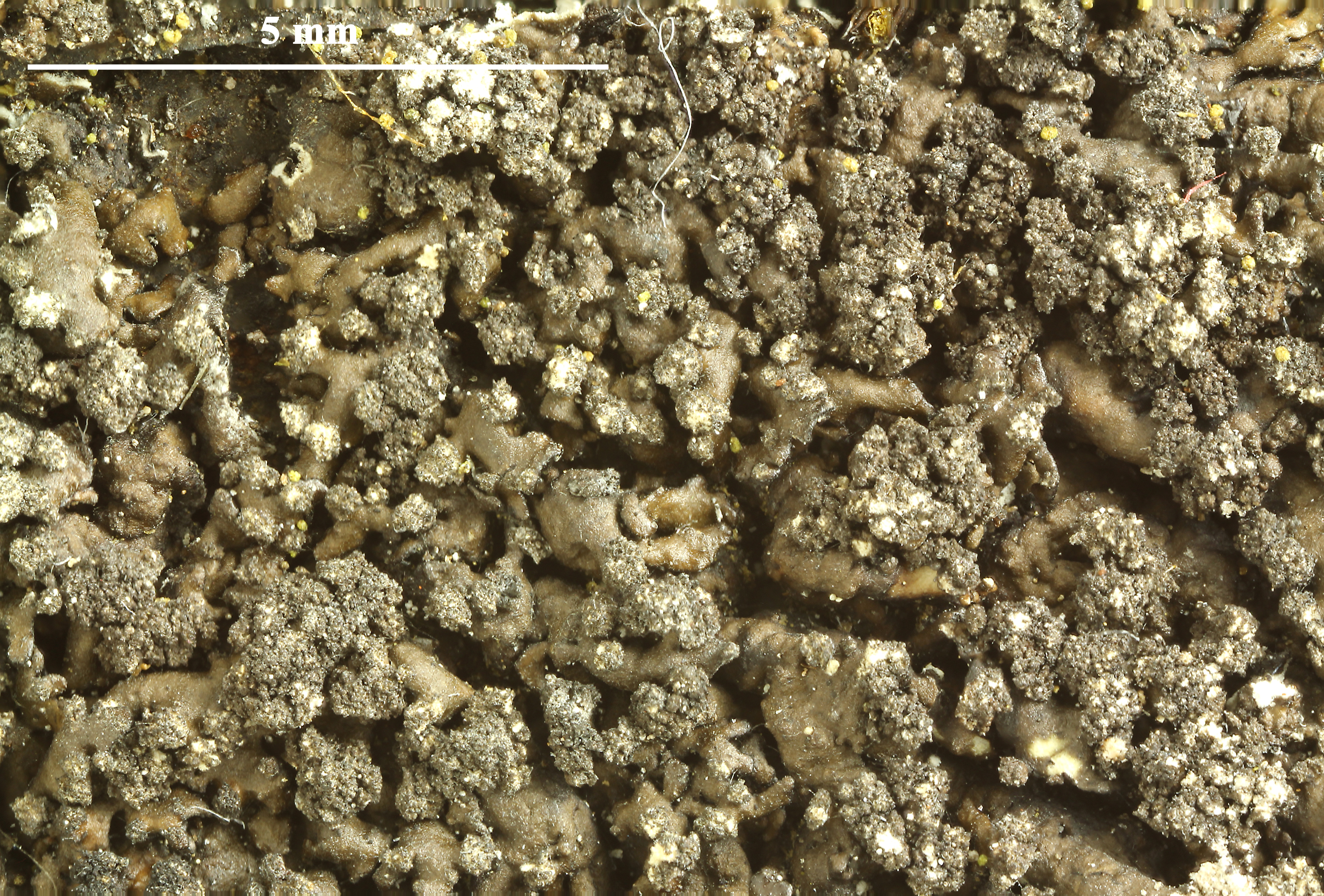
Closeup of thallus of M. disjuncta; scale bar = 5 mm

The genus reproduces sexually through laminal apothecia that are usually stalkless but may be very shortly pedicellate. Their discs start concave, become flat or slightly convex with age, and remain solid (imperforate); a ring of pseudocyphellae often rims the margin. The hymenium is 40–70 μm tall and contains eight spores per Lecanora-type ascus. These ascospores are simple, colourless, mostly ellipsoid (occasionally ovoid), and measure 8–12 × 4–7 μm, with walls up to 1 μm thick. Asexual propagation occurs in immersed, surface-level pycnidia that release cylindrical to spindle-shaped conidia 4–7.5 × 1 μm. Chemically the medulla produces orcinol depsides—especially perlatolic, stenosporic, or gyrophoric acid—which help to distinguish species within the genus.

== Habitat and distribution ==
Montanelia lichens are almost strictly saxicolous; in a few rare instances, they have been recorded growing on old wood. The genus as it is now circumscribed includes five species, which grow on rocks in montane regions of the northern hemisphere and north into the Arctic. Only a single species (M. panniformis) is reported from two localities in the southern hemisphere, the mountains of Venezuela and central Chile.

Field surveys spanning forty expeditions show that Greenland marks the present high-latitude limit of the genus. Only four of the broadly distributed taxa—M. disjuncta, M. panniformis, M. sorediata and M. tominii—reach the island, and none pushes into the north-coast polar desert. Of these, M. disjuncta is the most frequent, extending northward to about 79° N on sun-exposed, siliceous outcrops and guano-enriched basalt below roughly 1,000 m elevation. M. panniformis is locally abundant on moist, often overhanging siliceous faces in South- and Central-West Greenland but has not been recorded from the east coast. M. sorediata remains scarce, occurring mainly on coastal rocks in South-West Greenland with only scattered sites farther north and east. By contrast, M. tominii favours nutrient-rich cliffs and boulders influenced by bird guano or wind-blown loess, being common in continental inland valleys of South- and Central-West Greenland and sporadic along the east coast.

Three Montanelia species show narrow, allopatric ranges that contrast with the broadly distributed core taxa. M. occultipanniformis is known only from a rock outcrop in Denali National Park (Interior Alaska) and a lignum-rich talus slope in the Russian Far East; M. saximontana is confined to sorediate populations on siliceous rock across the Rocky Mountains and adjoining uplands of western North America; whereas the esorediate M. secwepemc occupies scattered saxicolous sites in British Columbia, the Yukon and interior Alaska.

Multilocus phylogeographic analyses reveal contrasting geographic patterns within the genus. M. disjuncta, M. panniformis (sensu stricto) and M. sorediata are genuinely intercontinental, showing little or no genetic structuring across Asia, Europe and North America. By contrast, the M. tominii assemblage comprises at least four evolutionary lineages—two confined to Asia and two to western North America—whose divergence is consistent with repeated dispersal across Beringia during Pleistocene glaciations.

Maximum-entropy niche models calibrated for Central Europe predict that habitat suitability for M. disjuncta is highest in the Western and Eastern Carpathians, the central Sudetes, and the eastern Alps, whereas the North German Plain provide the poorest conditions. The model for M. sorediata indicates a broader potential range stretching beyond the Carpathians and Alps to include the Bohemian–Moravian, Podolian, and Małopolska uplands; in both species seasonal precipitation emerged as the most influential climatic variable.

== Species ==
As of June 2025, Species Fungorum (in the Catalogue of Life) accept eight species of Montanelia:

- Montanelia disjuncta (Erichsen) Divakar, A.Crespo, Wedin & Essl. (2012)
- Montanelia occultipanniformis S.D.Leav., Essl., Divakar, A.Crespo & Lumbsch (2016)
- Montanelia panniformis (Nyl.) Divakar, A.Crespo, Wedin & Essl. (2012)
- Montanelia predisjuncta (Essl.) Divakar, A.Crespo, Wedin & Essl. (2012)
- Montanelia saximontana (R.A.Anderson & W.A.Weber) S.D.Leav., Essl., Divakar, A.Crespo & Lumbsch (2016)
- Montanelia secwepemc S.D.Leav., Essl., Divakar, A.Crespo & Lumbsch (2016)
- Montanelia sorediata (Ach.) Divakar, A.Crespo, Wedin & Essl. (2012)
- Montanelia tominii (Oxner) Divakar, A.Crespo, Wedin & Essl. (2012)
