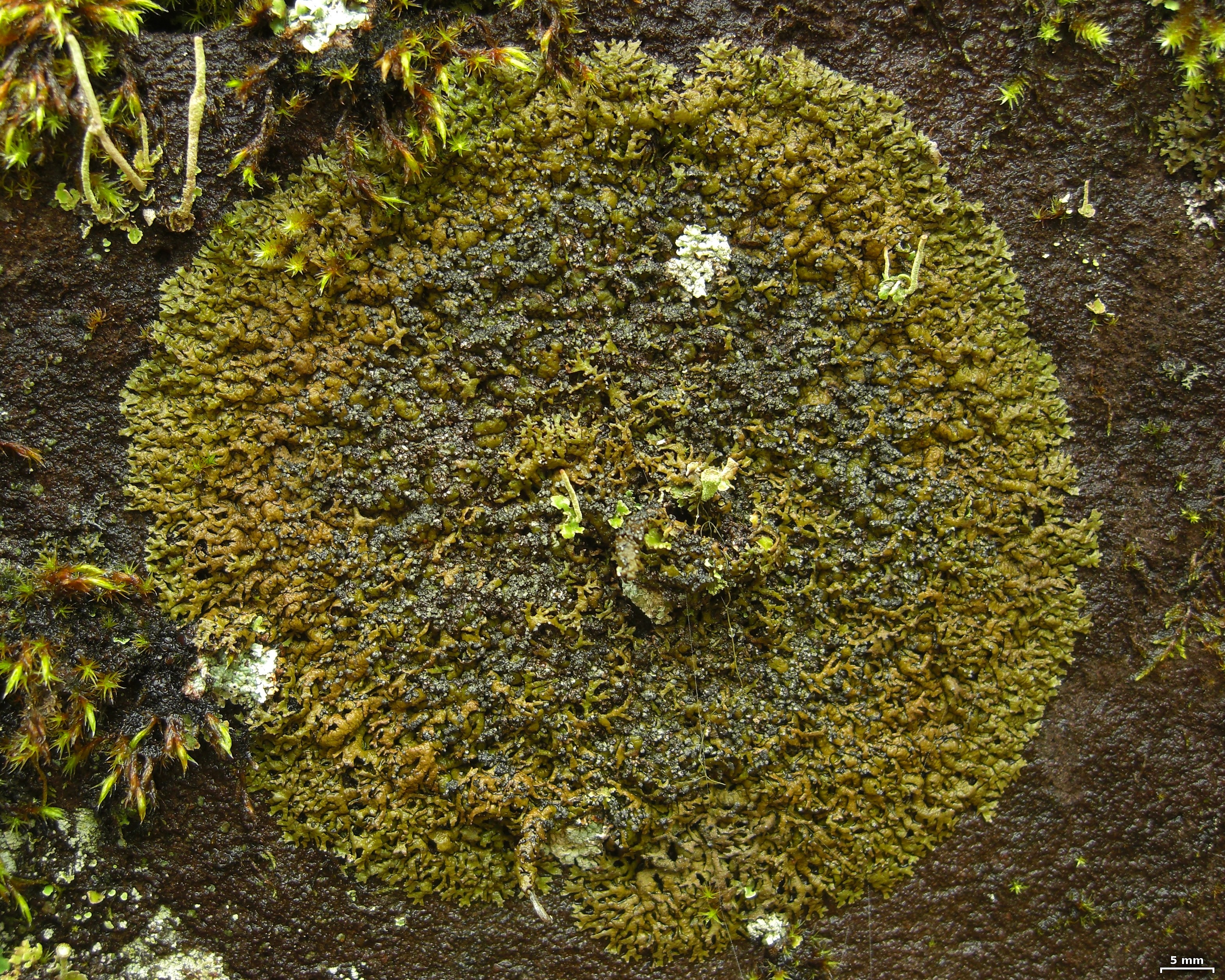
- In Wells Gray Provincial Park, British Columbia

Scientific classification
- Kingdom: Fungi
- Division: Ascomycota
- Class: Lecanoromycetes
- Order: Lecanorales
- Family: Parmeliaceae
- Genus: Montanelia
- Species: M. sorediata

Binomial name
- Montanelia sorediata (Ach.) Divakar, A.Crespo, Wedin & Essl. (2012)

Synonyms
- List: Parmelia stygia var. sorediata Ach. (1810); Parmelia sorediata (Ach.) Röhl. (1813); Parmelia stygia f. sorediata (Ach.) Ach. (1814); Parmelia prolixa f. sorediata (Ach.) Nyl. (1861); Parmelia prolixa var. sorediata (Ach.) Nyl. (1861); Parmelia olivacea f. sorediata (Ach.) Nyl. (1861); Parmelia olivacea var. sorediata (Ach.) Nyl. (1866); Imbricaria sorediata (Ach.) Arnold (1870); Parmelia olivacea subsp. sorediata (Ach.) Th.Fr. (1871); Parmelia prolixa subsp. sorediata (Ach.) Nyl. ex Lamy (1880); Melanelia sorediata (Ach.) Goward & Ahti (1987); Parmelia sorediosa Almb. (1947); Melanelia sorediosa (Almb.) Essl. (1978)

= Montanelia sorediata =

Species of lichen

Montanelia sorediata is a species of saxicolous (rock-dwelling) foliose lichen in the family Parmeliaceae. It has narrow, olive to dark brown lobes and reproduces vegetatively through powdery soredia. The species occurs on siliceous rocks in North America and Europe, favouring mountainous regions and upland areas.

== Taxonomy ==
The lichen was first described by the Swedish lichenologist Erik Acharius in 1810 as a variety of Parmelia stygia. After its original publication, later nineteenth-century authors shuttled the taxon among ranks within the broad Parmelia complex, variously treating it as a species, form, variety or subspecies allied to P. stygia, P. prolixa or P. olivacea, and even placing it in Imbricaria. Those combinations (e.g., Parmelia sorediata, P. stygia f./var. sorediata, P. prolixa f./var./subsp. sorediata, P. olivacea f./var./subsp. sorediata, and Imbricaria sorediata) are now regarded as synonyms.

In the twentieth century Ove Almborn introduced the segregate name Parmelia sorediosa, which Ted Esslinger later recombined in Melanelia; subsequent work united that concept with Acharius's epithet, and Trevor Goward and Teuvo Ahti made the new combination Melanelia sorediata. Molecular studies then showed that Melanelia (as then circumscribed) was polyphyletic, with the so-called disjuncta group – including this species – belonging in the parmelioid rather than the cetrarioid clade. Divakar and co-workers consequently erected Montanelia and transferred the species as Montanelia sorediata (the current usage). Montanelia is characterised by short, narrow lobes, a non-pored epicortex, orcinol-depside chemistry, and (in this species) absence of pseudocyphellae.

== Description ==
Montanelia sorediata forms a small, leaf-like thallus (the lichen body) that is loosely attached to rock. The lobes are narrow (about 0.2–0.6 mm wide), flat to slightly convex and often elongate and strap-like, with tips that appear crinkled and faintly pitted. The upper thallus surface is olive to dark brown, usually matt though the lobe ends may shine a little, and it is generally smooth. The species reproduces mainly by abundant terminal soralia, which are small, convex, button-like patches (about 0.2–0.8 mm across) that form at the ends of the main lobes or on short, upright side branches. These soralia release soredia, which are powdery clumps of algal and fungal cells used for vegetative spread. The soredia are granular and can become isidioid, and although dark they often look whitish where rubbed. Diagnostic absences include no pseudocyphellae (the minute pores/lines seen on the surface of some related taxa) and no pycnidia (tiny asexual spore bodies); sexual fruiting bodies (apothecia) were not seen in the material examined. Chemically, the thallus contains perlatolic and stenosporic acids, chemical markers useful for separating it from similar brown parmelioid lichens.

== Habitat and distribution ==
Montanelia sorediata is a rock-dwelling (saxicolous) species that prefers siliceous substrates. In lowland settings it is typically found on siliceous erratic boulders in open, well-lit places, while in mountains it occurs on natural outcrops such as granite, sandstone and gneiss. Species distribution modelling for Central Europe indicates that precipitation-related variables are the strongest drivers of its potential range.

It occurs in North America and Europe and is widespread in Central and Eastern Europe. In Poland it is relatively frequent from lowlands to mountains, with an eastern bias; it has not been recorded from the Sudetes, and in the Carpathians it is mainly in valleys and lower slopes up to about 800 m elevation. Modelling points to the Carpathians and the eastern Alps as the areas of highest suitability, with additional favourable zones in several regional uplands; lowland occurrences likely reflect local microclimates and the availability of silicate rock.
