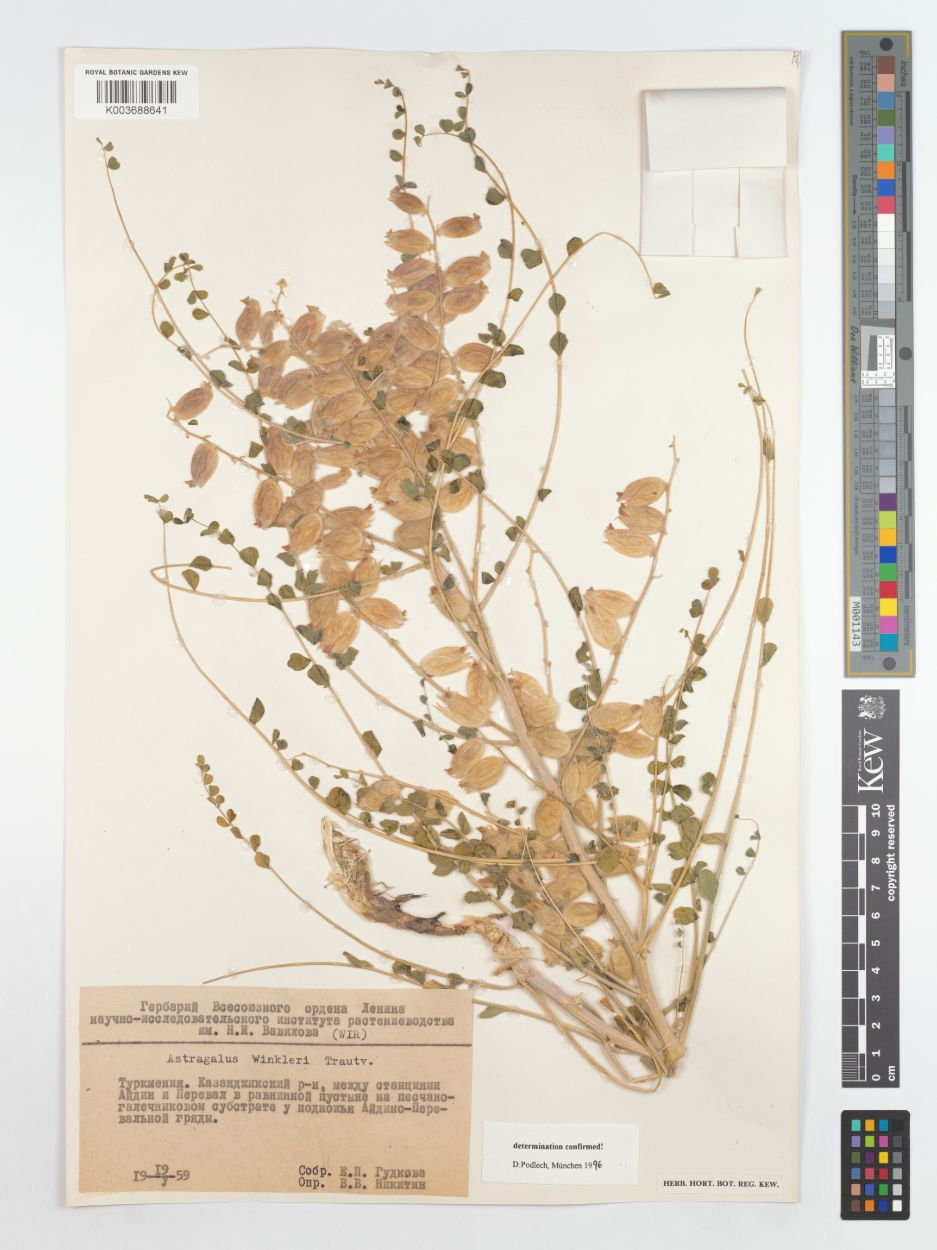

Scientific classification
- Kingdom: Plantae
- Clade: Embryophytes
- Clade: Tracheophytes
- Clade: Spermatophytes
- Clade: Angiosperms
- Clade: Eudicots
- Clade: Rosids
- Order: Fabales
- Family: Fabaceae
- Subfamily: Faboideae
- Genus: Astragalus
- Species: A. winkleri

Binomial name
- Astragalus winkleri Trautv.

= Astragalus winkleri =

Species of flowering plant

Astragalus winkleri is a species of flowering plant in the family Fabaceae. It is a perennial.

The species is native to Turkmenistan, and was described in 1886.

== Taxonomy ==
The species was named by Ernst Rudolf von Trautvetter in 1886.

== Distribution ==
The species is native to the temperate biome of northwest Kopet Dag, Turkmenistan.

== Nomenclature ==
In Russian, the species is known as Астрагал Винклера (Astragal Vinklera).
