= Kyiv Botanical Gardens =

Kyiv Botanical Gardens may refer to either of two places in Kyiv, Ukraine:

- A.V. Fomin Botanical Garden, or Kyiv University's Botanical Garden
- Hryshko National Botanical Garden
