= Astragalus cyri =

Conservation status
- Endangered (IUCN 3.1)

Scientific classification
- Kingdom: Plantae
- Clade: Tracheophytes
- Clade: Angiosperms
- Clade: Eudicots
- Clade: Rosids
- Order: Fabales
- Family: Fabaceae
- Subfamily: Faboideae
- Genus: Astragalus
- Species: A. cyri

Binomial name
- Astragalus cyri Fomin ex Grossh.

Synonyms
- Astragalus purpureus Fomin.

Species of flowering plant

Astragalus cyri is a species of flowering plant in the family Fabaceae.

== Description ==
Astragalus cyri is an ornamental legume with purple flowers. It is a perennial.

The species grows in temperate middle montane habitats in southern and eastern Georgia. It is found in dry, rocky, areas, at elevations from 600 to 1,400 metres.

== Conservation ==
In 2024, Astragalus cyri was assessed as endangered. It occurs across an area of around 170km^{2} and faces habitat loss due to urban development.
