= Ernst Rudolf von Trautvetter =

Baltic German botanist (1809–1889)

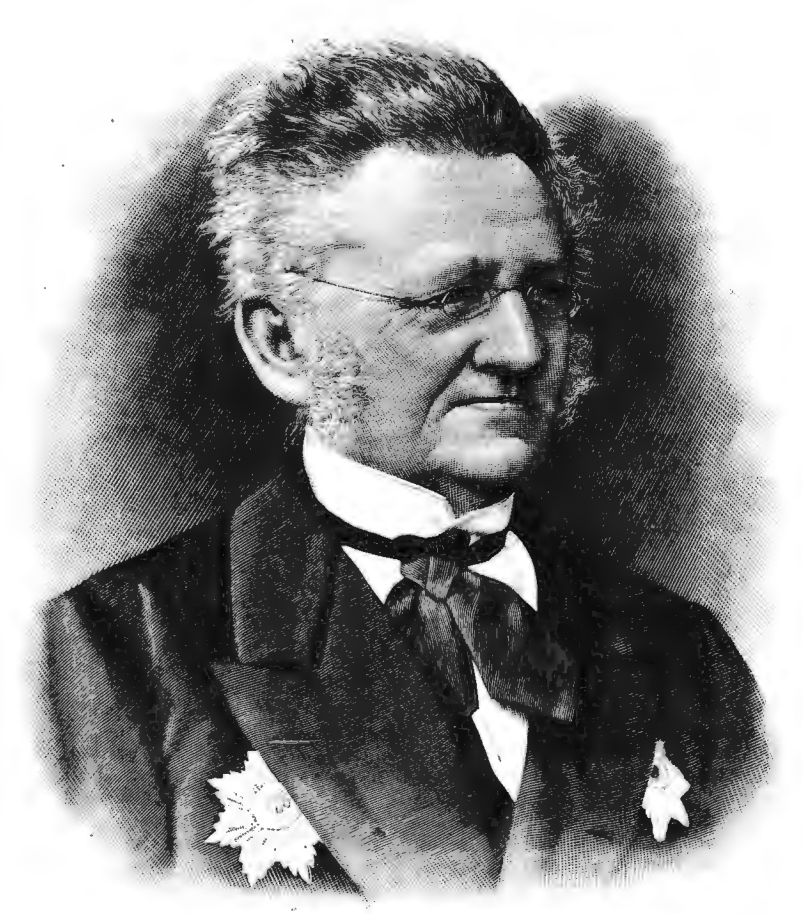
- Engraving, 1889
- Born: February 20, 1809; Jelgava, Russian Empire
- Died: January 24, 1889 (aged 79); Saint Petersburg, Russian Empire
- Education: University of Dorpat
- Father: Ernst Christian Johann von Trautvetter
- Scientific career
- Fields: Botany, particularly the flora of the Caucasus and Central Asia
- Workplaces: University of Tartu Botanical Garden, Saint Petersburg Botanical Garden, A.V. Fomin Botanical Garden
- Author abbrev. (botany): Trautv.

Ernst Rudolf von Trautvetter (20 February 1809 – 24 January 1889) was a Baltic German botanist, specialising in the flora of the Caucasus and Central Asia.

== Life ==
He studied medicine and natural sciences at the University of Dorpat. From 1829 to 1831, he conducted botanical field trips throughout Livonia, returning to Jelgava in 1831 as a private instructor. In 1833, he began work as an assistant at the botanical garden in Dorpat, two years later, performing similar duties at the botanical garden in St. Petersburg. In 1838 he relocated to Kiev as a professor of botany and director of the botanical garden. During his many years in Kiev, he served as university rector from 1847 to 1859. Later in his career, he returned to the botanical garden in St. Petersburg as an administrator and director. Here, he was tasked with publishing an account of the garden's history.

He is honoured in the name of the maple, Acer trautvetteri (Trautvetter's Maple), native to the Caucasus, and the genus Trautvetteria.

== Selected works ==
Among his numerous writings were treatises on the genera Echinops and Trifolium. The following are a few of his principal publications:

- Ueber die Nebenblätter: Eine naturwissenschaftliche Abhandlung, 1831 Trautvetter's first publication, a work on plant stipules.
- Grundriss einer Geschichte der Botanik in bezug auf Russland, 1837 - Outline on the history of Russian botany as a reference.
- Plantarum imagines et descriptiones floram russicam illustrantes, 1844
- Die pflanzengeographischen Verhältnisse des Europäischen Russlands, 1850 - Phytogeographical conditions of European Russia.
- Ueber Die Geographische Der Herniaria-Arten in Russland, 1865 - On the geography of Herniaria located in Russia.
- Plantas Caspio-Caucasicas, a Dre. G. Radde et A. Becker anno 1876, (1877) Caspian-Caucasus plants, of Gustav Radde and A. Becker from 1876.
- Plantas Sibiriae borealis ab A. Czekanowski et F. Mueller, annis 1874 et 1875 lectas, (1877) - Plants of northern Siberia from Aleksander Czekanowski and F. Mueller (1874–75).
- Flora riparia Kolymensis, 1878.

The standard botanical author abbreviation Trautv. is applied to plants he described.

== Sources ==
- "Траутфеттер, Эрнст-Рудольф Эрнестович" . Brockhaus and Efron Encyclopedic Dictionary (in Russian). 1906.
