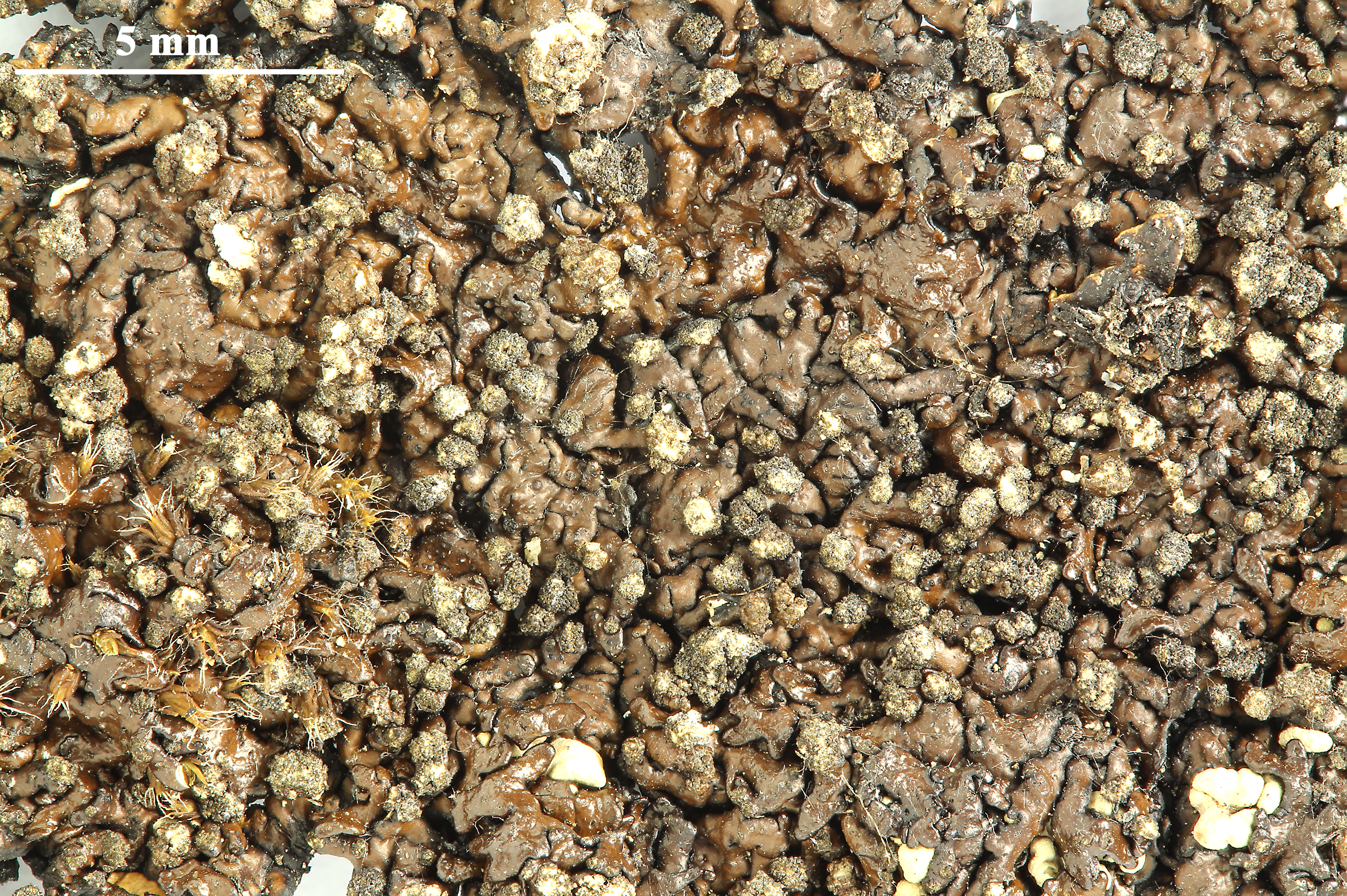
- photographed in Austria; scale bar: 5 mm

Scientific classification
- Kingdom: Fungi
- Division: Ascomycota
- Class: Lecanoromycetes
- Order: Lecanorales
- Family: Parmeliaceae
- Genus: Montanelia
- Species: M. tominii

Binomial name
- Montanelia tominii (Oxner) Divakar, A.Crespo, Wedin & Essl. (2012)

Synonyms
- List: Parmelia tominii Oxner (1933); Parmelia substygia Räsänen (1935); Parmelia borisorum Oxner (1940); Parmelia altaica Oxner (1970); Melanelia tominii (Oxner) Essl. (1992)

= Montanelia tominii =

Species of lichen-forming fungus

Montanelia tominii, the dimpled camouflage lichen, is a species of foliose lichen in the family Parmeliaceae. The lichen forms variable, leaf-like thalli that range from thin and closely pressed to thicker and cushion-like, typically olive-brown to reddish-brown on the upper surface, with a dark brown to black underside. It is characterized by whitish pit-like or slit-like markings on the upper surface, sometimes forming faint patterns, and by powdery reproductive granules that can become coarse and clumped. The species occurs across the circumpolar Northern Hemisphere, growing on non-calcareous rocks in arctic and subarctic regions and at high elevations farther south. It has also been reported from Armenia. It was described under several different names over the 20th century before being recognized as a single widespread species.

== Taxonomy ==
Montanelia tominii was originally described by the Ukrainian lichenologist Alfred Oxner in 1933 as Parmelia tominii, based on saxicolous (rock-dwelling) material collected in 1927 in Chita Province (near Atamanovka, Russia). In a later reassessment of Oxner's type specimens from the brown, parmelioid species then placed in Parmelia, Ted Esslinger examined the surviving original material at the National Herbarium of Ukraine (KW) and designated a lectotype (a single reference specimen) for P. tominii. He concluded that Oxner's P. tominii referred to the same widespread Northern Hemisphere species that had usually been treated under the later name Melanelia substygia (based on Räsänen's Parmelia substygia of 1935); because Oxner's name predates it, the epithet tominii has priority. Esslinger therefore recombined the species as Melanelia tominii and treated M. substygia as a synonym; he also reduced Oxner's later names Parmelia altaica and Parmelia borisorum to synonymy, and later work treated the North American name Parmelia saximontana (described in 1962) as another synonym.

The lectotype of Parmelia tominii at the National Herbarium of Ukraine (KW) consists of two small saxicolous fragments (about 2–3 cm across). One fragment shows conspicuous whitish pseudocyphellae that can be partly elongate and may form a weak network (reticulum), while the other has mostly rounded to slightly elongate pseudocyphellae; in both fragments the lower surface is pale tan to brownish in younger parts but becomes dark brown to blackish towards the centre, and no soredia are present.

Before Montanelia was erected, an internal transcribed spacer (ITS)-based phylogenetic analysis of Chinese material identified as Melanelia tominii recovered the species as a single, well-supported lineage and placed it within a clade of Melanelixia; the authors suggested that it was likely misplaced in Melanelia but did not propose a formal new combination because their molecular sampling was limited. Later multilocus DNA analyses placed the "Melanelia disjuncta group" in a separate, well-supported lineage within the parmelioid core, while Melanelia sensu stricto (type species M. stygia) falls in the cetrarioid core; additional analyses did not support merging the two groups in a single clade. On that basis, Montanelia was described as a new genus segregated from Melanelia and the new combination Montanelia tominii was made. Subsequent molecular work indicates that the M. tominii complex includes cryptic species that are morphologically similar but genetically distinct.

A DNA barcoding study of the 13 "brown Parmeliae" reported from Greenland used ITS sequences to test whether the recognized species could be reliably separated. An ITS-based evolutionary tree recovered Montanelia tominii as a well-supported lineage but also found several well-supported genetic groupings within the species; the reported genetic distances suggested comparatively high intraspecific ITS variation in M. tominii and that species limits in this complex may need reassessment.

In North America, Montanelia tominii is commonly known as the "dimpled camouflage lichen". In a lichen inventory of White Rocks Open Space in Boulder, Colorado, the species was informally described as "cacao river".

== Description ==
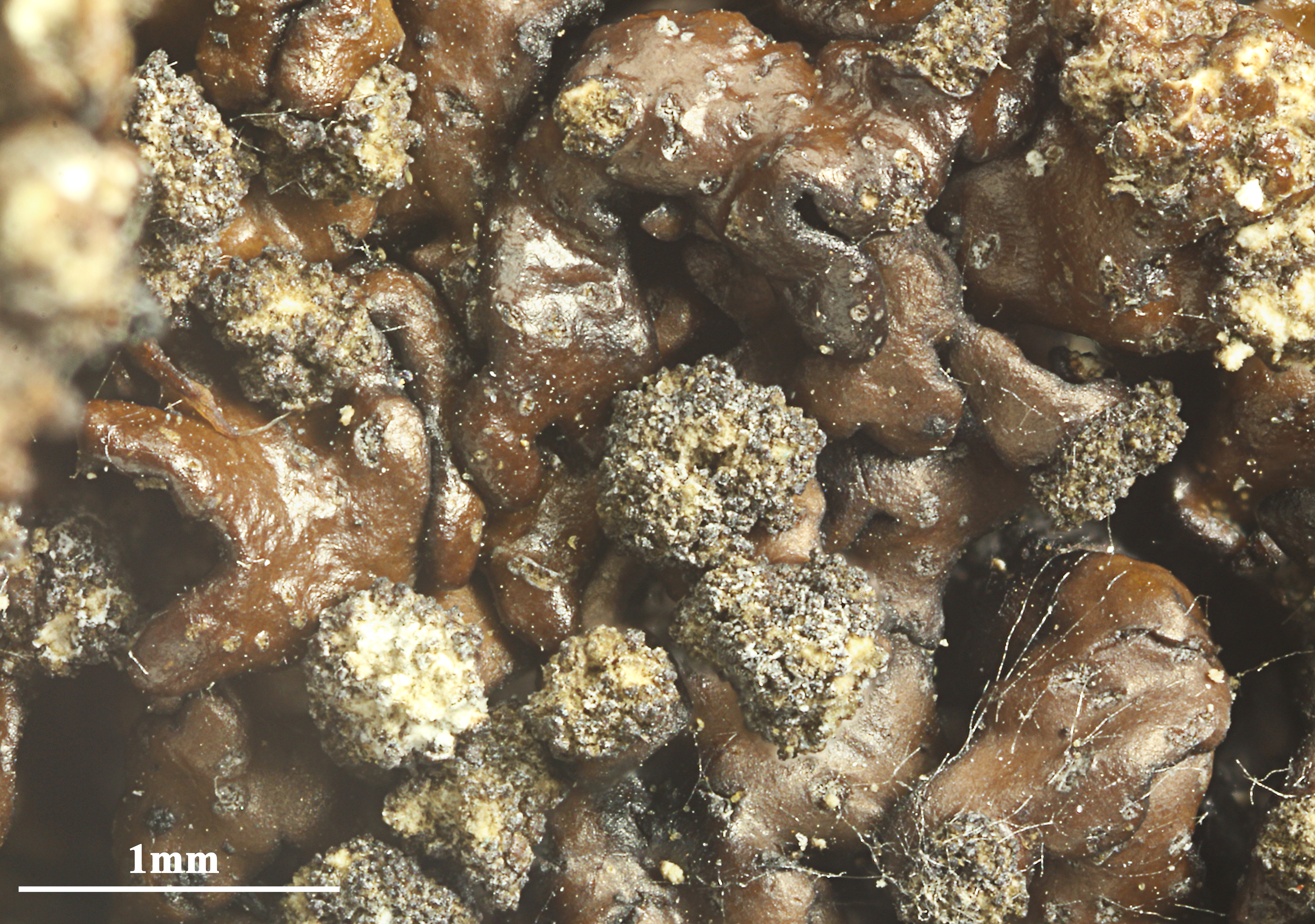
Close-up of the thallus showing coarse, clumped soralia on a dark brown, strongly wrinkled upper surface. Collected on gneiss at about 1,600 m in the Ötztal Alps, Tyrol, Austria. Scale bar: 1 mm.

Montanelia tominii is a foliose lichen whose thallus is usually appressed but can become thicker and more cushion-like, reaching about 10(–14) cm across. Lobes are short and typically about 1–3(–4) mm wide; the upper surface ranges from pale olive-brown or tan-brown to yellowish- or reddish-brown, sometimes darkening, and may be dull to strongly glossy. The surface is often smoother near lobe tips but becomes more fissured or wrinkled (rugose) towards the centre. The lower surface is dark brown to black (at least centrally), sometimes paler near lobe ends, with moderately developed rhizines (root-like attachment threads).

Pseudocyphellae on the upper surface (laminal pseudocyphellae) are usually present and may be conspicuous and roundish to somewhat elongate. In very exposed northern habitats they can be hard to see. More sheltered parts of the same thallus may still show them clearly. Asexual reproduction is variable. Many thalli develop soralia that produce coarse soredia, but some thalli lack soredia altogether (esorediate forms). Intermediate forms are common, and Esslinger regarded this variation as essentially continuous rather than evidence for separate taxa.

Apothecia (sexual fruiting bodies) are often present. They are up to about 6 mm across, may become irregular with age, and the margin frequently becomes sorediate. Each ascus typically contains eight ascospores that measure about 8.5–11 × 4.5–7 micrometres (μm). Pycnidia are common, immersed in the upper surface, and produce asexual spores (conidia) about 5–7 × 1 μm with a cylindrical to weakly fusiform shape.

In standard lichen spot tests, the outer layer (cortex) shows no K reaction (K–), while the inner layer (medulla) turns rose to rose-red with C (C+) and with KC (KC+). Thin-layer chromatography identifies gyrophoric acid as the major substance in the medulla, usually with ovoic acid (2'-O-methylgyrophoric acid) and a minor, still-unidentified compound ("W.G.-1"). Esslinger also reported a chemotype in which ovoic acid is replaced by umbilicaric acid (2-O-methylgyrophoric acid).

=== Similar species ===
In Greenland, pale, larger forms of Montanelia disjuncta can resemble M. tominii. In such cases, M. tominii is distinguished by pseudocyphellae mainly on the upper surface (laminal) rather than mainly near the lobe margins (submarginal) and by a C+ (rose-red) reaction in the medulla. For reliable results, the C test should be done on freshly exposed medulla from younger parts of the thallus, since old, long-exposed medulla may react weakly or not at all. The species can resemble Melanelia stygia in outward appearance, but the two differ in secondary chemistry: M. tominii produces gyrophoric acid, whereas M. stygia contains β-orcinol depsidones such as fumarprotocetraric and protocetraric acids.

== Habitat and distribution ==
On the basis of more than 300 specimens, M. tominii was treated as a single, widely distributed Northern Hemisphere species. The type material of Parmelia tominii and its synonyms was collected from rock, and Oxner's later synonym P. altaica was explicitly collected on non-calcareous rock in the Altai Mountains. In discussing northern morphology, Esslinger compared the Oxner types with material from far-northern regions (including Alaska, northern Canada, and Greenland) and with specimens from Europe and North America more generally. The species was first reported from Armenia in 2016. Wang and co-authors documented the species from multiple mountain localities in China, where it was collected on rock at about 1,600–5,000 m elevation (for example, Mt Arxan in Inner Mongolia and Mt Qomolangma in Tibet). They described it as widely distributed across the Northern Hemisphere. In Nepal, Melanelia tominii has been reported from 3,200 to 3,600 m elevation in a compilation of published records.

In Colorado, Montanelia tominii has been recorded from White Rocks Open Space in Boulder, Colorado, a sandstone outcrop site surveyed in 2014. In that inventory it was assessed as an occasional species. At White Rocks it was recorded on hard sandstone, especially on boulders and on tilted to vertical rock faces. In Greenland, Montanelia tominii grows on exposed siliceous and basaltic rocks, especially where windblown dust (including loess) or bird guano enriches the rock surface; it may also occur over moss on such rocks. It is reported as common in South West and Central West Greenland, especially in more continental areas (for example around the head of Kangerlussuaq), and more scattered in South East and Central East Greenland.
