= Aleksandr Fomin (botanist) =

Aleksandr Vasiljevich Fomin
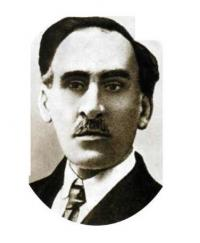
- Fomin, before 1935
- Born: 2 May 1869; Ermolevka, Petrovsk, Saratov Oblast, Russia
- Died: 16 October 1935 (aged 66); Kiev
- Education: Kiev Taras Shevchenko University
- Known for: Taxonomy; Botany
- Scientific career
- Fields: Botany
- Author abbrev. (botany): Fomin

Aleksandr Vasiljevich Fomin (1869-1935) was a botanist. He studied ferns and seed plants. He was also a director of the Kiev University Botanical Garden; which was renamed after him, when he died. He was a subject of the Russian Empire and later the Soviet Union.

== Biography ==
He was born in the village of Ermolevka in Petrovsk, Saratov Oblast on (14 May [O.S. 2 May] 1869.

From 1888 to 1890, Fomin along with Nicolaĭ Adolfowitsch Busch and Nikolai Ivanovich Kuznetsov, funded by the Russian Geographical Society, took several botanical and geographical expeditions to the Caucasus.

In 1893, he graduated from Moscow University.

In 1896, he became a graduate assistant at the Universität Dorpat (now known as the University of Tartu, Estonia).

Fomin, Busch and Kuznetsov later wrote 'Flora Caucasica critica' (Materially dlia flory Kavkaza : kriticheskoe sistematichesko-geograficheskoe izsliedovanie), which was published between 1901 and 1913. It was written as a special supplement to the journal 'Trudy Sankt-Peterburgskogo obshchestva estestvoispytatelei', v. 31, pt. 3, 1901, and v. 34, pt. 3 1905–1908. This published several new species of plant including, Arabidopsis pumila,

In 1902 he became a botanist at the Tbilisi Botanical Gardens.

Between 1907 and 1919, he wrote 'Kavkaza i Kryma' (Flora of the European part of Russia, An illustrated key to the wild plants of European part of Russia and Crimea) with Yury Nikolaevich Voronov, about plant species in the Caucasus. Although, it was unfinished due to the start of the First World War. He also wrote in 1907 'Cucurbitaceae i Companulaceae flory Kaukaza'.

In 1914, Fomin became a professor at the University of Kiev, (under O. Fomin).

Between 1914 and 1935, he served as director of the Saint Vladimir University Botanical Garden, Kiev, Ukraine. During the severe winter of 1919–1920, he and his team saved many green-house plant collections from the frost.

In 1921, he founded the National Herbarium of Ukraine, which holds his specimens.

In 1922, Fomin founded the botany department at the Botanical Garden, that was reorganized in 1927 into the 'Scientific-Research Botany Institute' (now the Institute of Botany named after Kholodny Academy of Sciences of Ukraine).

When he died in 1935, the university renamed the garden, the A.V. Fomin Botanical Garden.

An extensive collection of species collected from the Caucasus is stored within the sheltered herbarium at University of Tartu, in Estonia.

He is the botanical author of many species including; Allium atroviolaceum, Allium callidyction, Allium rupestre, Astragalus cyri, Asyneuma lobelioides, Campanula Andina, Campanula Armena, Campanula bayerniana, Campanula besenginica, Campanula raddeana, Campanula petrophila, Campanula daghestanica, Campanula longistyla, Campanula sibirica, Campanula suanetica, Centaurea daralagoezica, Crocus suwarowianus, Cryptogramma brunoniana, Fritillaria michailovskyi, Galanthus transcaucasicus, Iris acutiloba var. schelkowinkowii, Myriophyllum spicatum, Pseudomuscari forniculatum. Tulipa schmidtii

Although, he has collaborated on some publications with Alexander Alfonsovich Grossheim on many articles.

He is mentioned in D.J. Mabberley portable plant books of 1997.

Several botanical species have been named in his honor, including; Cirsium fominii Petr., Crinitaria fominii ( Kem.-Nath. ) Czerep., Campanula fominii Grossh. Kolak. & Serdyuk., Colchicum fominii Bordz., Polystichum × fominii Askerov & A.Bobrov, Juncus fominii Zoz, Acinos fominii Shost.-Desiat., Acantholimon fominii Kusn. and Atropis fominii Bilyk.
