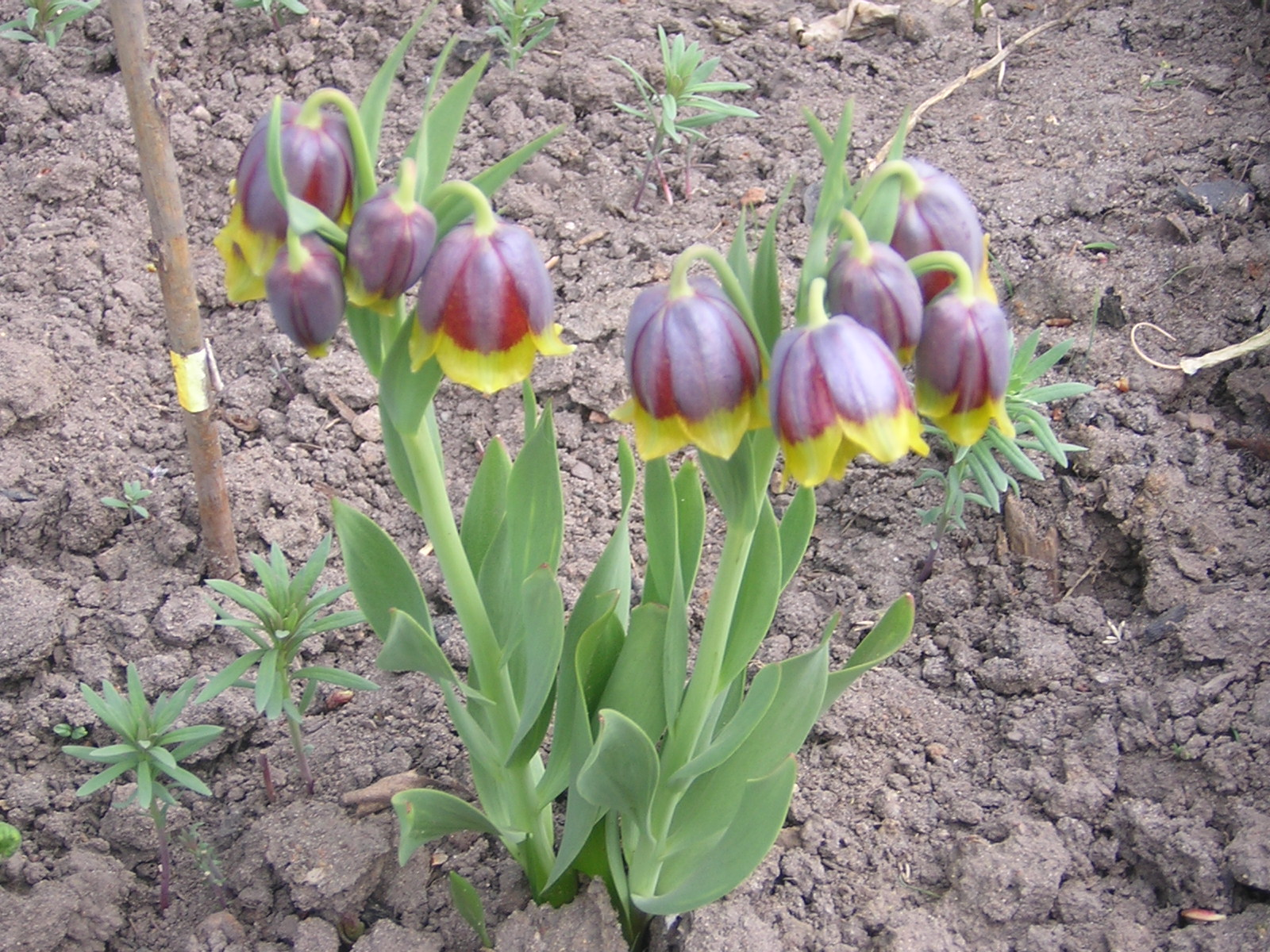

Scientific classification
- Kingdom: Plantae
- Clade: Tracheophytes
- Clade: Angiosperms
- Clade: Monocots
- Order: Liliales
- Family: Liliaceae
- Subfamily: Lilioideae
- Genus: Fritillaria
- Species: F. michailovskyi

Binomial name
- Fritillaria michailovskyi Fomin

= Fritillaria michailovskyi =

Species of flowering plant

Fritillaria michailovskyi is a species of flowering plant in the lily family Liliaceae, native to mountainous areas of northeastern Turkey. It has been named as Aslay, after Meral Aslay, a researcher from the team who discovered it. It is a bulbous perennial growing to 10–20 cm (4–8 in) tall, with narrow strap-shaped leaves and nodding umbels of distinctive, pendent, bell-shaped maroon flowers with yellow tips in spring.

In cultivation, it requires very well-drained conditions, as it does not tolerate winter wet.

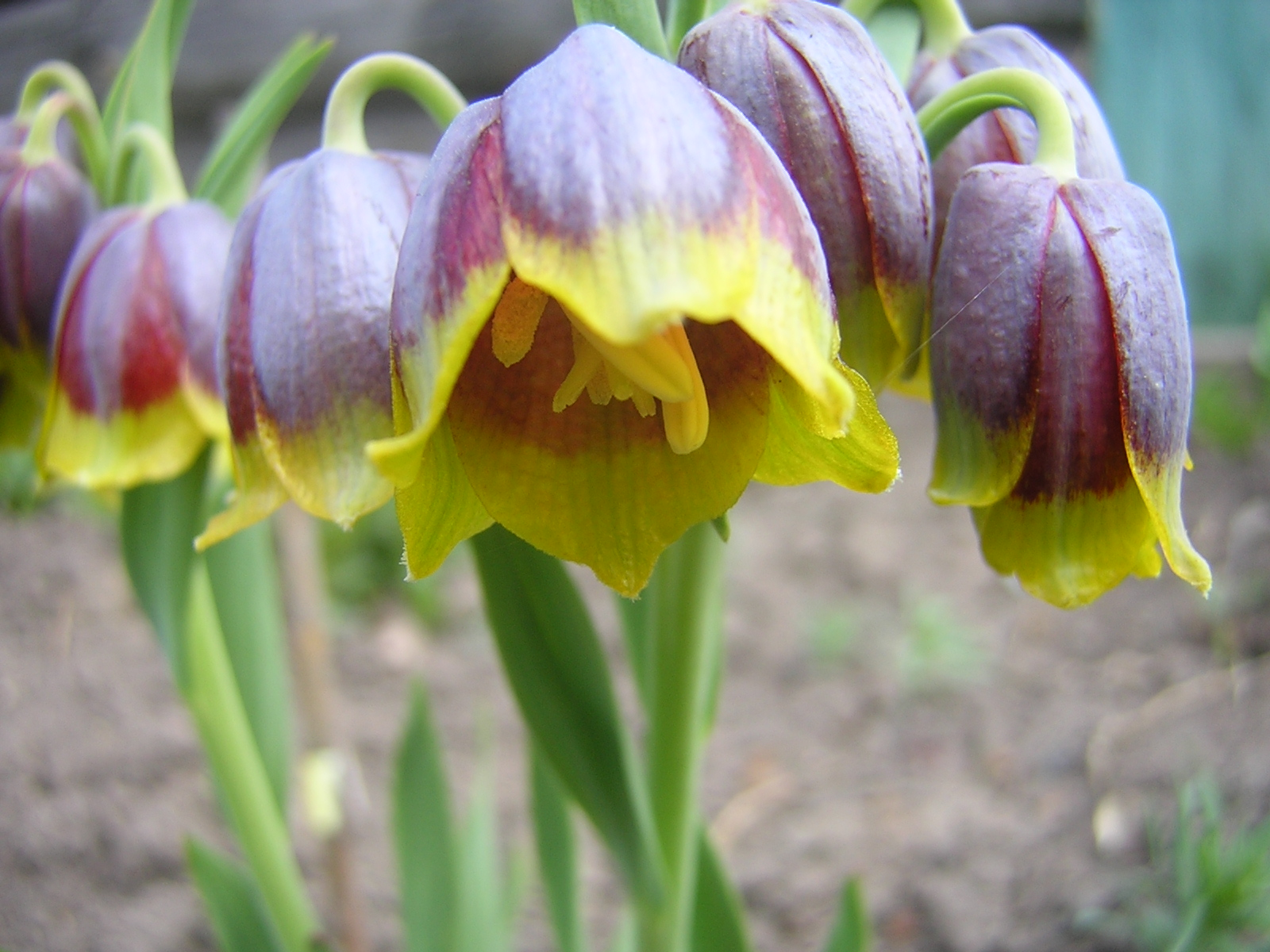

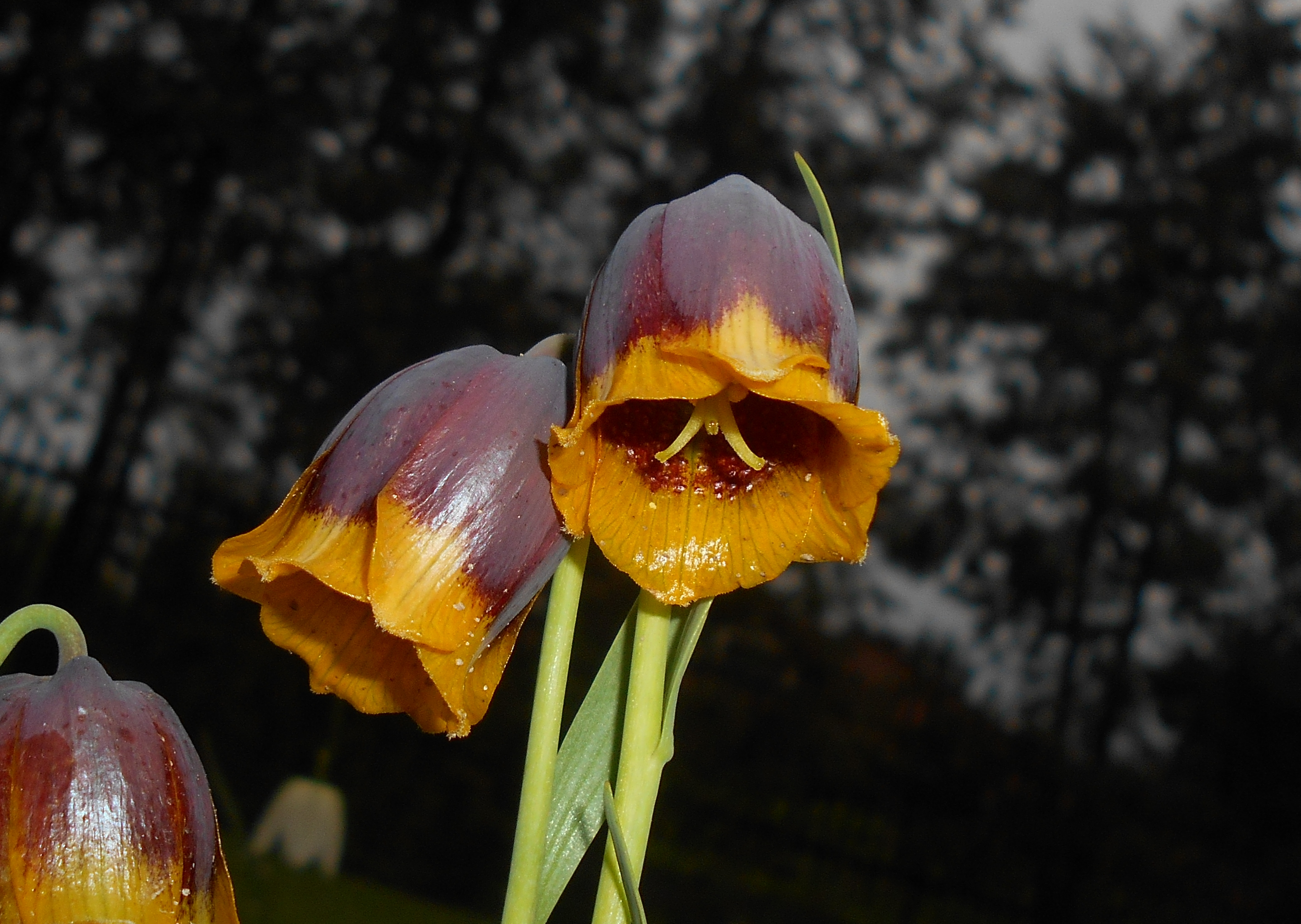
