= A.V. Fomin Botanical Garden =

Botanical garden in Kyiv, Ukraine

Coordinates: 50.4441°N 30.5057°E

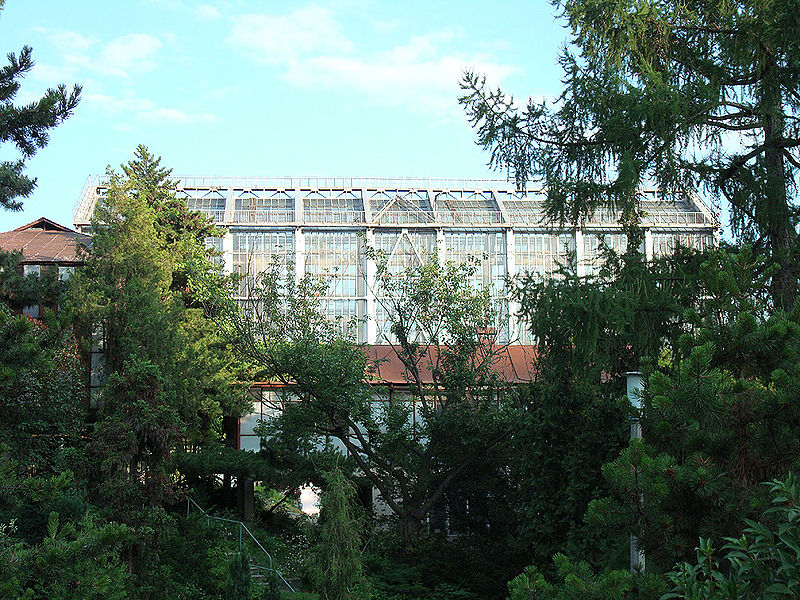
Klimatron Conservatory in Alexander Fomin Botanical Gardens, Kyiv.

The A.V. Fomin Botanical Garden (sometimes transliterated as O.V. Fomin Botanical Garden) is one of the oldest botanical gardens in Ukraine, located in Kyiv, the capital of Ukraine. In 1839 the Saint Vladimir Imperial University of Kyiv opened its own botanical garden. The botanical garden is 22.5 hectares (0.225 km^{2}), with 8,000 plant species, including 143 recorded in the Red Data Book of Ukraine. The Garden is famous for its exotic plants: it has the biggest collection of succulents among the countries of the former Soviet Union. The greenhouse, which was built for the largest and the oldest palm trees in Northern Eurasia, is among the highest in the world. In 1935, the garden was named after the academician and botanist Aleksandr Vasiljevich Fomin, who directed the garden for years. The vestibule of the Kyiv Metro station Universytet, is located on the northern edge of the garden, which was opened in 1960.

== History ==
Architect V.I. Beretti who as well known by his project of Kyiv University, was the first who raised issue of botanical garden establishment in 1834. He proposed to place the garden on the waste territory near the university buildings. For this purpose, from Kremenets Lyceum (Kyiv) 513 plants were brought, that were temporarily placed in the Tsar (now City) garden. However, due to lack of funds, the garden establishment was postponed for 5 years. Only in 1839 the Kyiv school district administration gave permission for a temporary Botanical Garden to start under the direction of Head of the botany department of Kyiv University Ernst Trautvetter, who then managed the Botanical Garden in the position of director.

The official date of the Kyiv Botanical Garden establishment is 22 May 1839, when E. Trautfetter started the first plantings. In 1841 the garden received its permanent status. In 1850 design and layout of the garden were completed. By 1852 there were 25,416 trees and 419 species of shrubs, as well as more than 4,000 species of other plants in the garden.

1941-1943, during the Nazi occupation, many precious plants from the collection were lost. Some plants were transported to Germany. In the spring of 1944 the garden was reopened to the public, the restoration of greenhouses and plant collections started.

In 1960, the garden was declared an artifact of landscape art of the national importance.

In 1977, a greenhouse-climatron was built at the Garden, that was one of the largest in the world at that time.

=== Directors ===
- 1852 – 1879 — University professor Afanasiy Rogovich.
- 1879 – 1894 — a prominent botanist, the Botany professor Johannes Theodor Schmalhausen headed the Botanical Garden.
- 1894 – 1914 — Sergei Navashin. He is associated with remarkable discoveries in the field of cyto-embryology of the plants, that made the Garden and the Kyiv University famous worldwide.
- 1914 – 1935 — Alexander Fomin (1867 – 1935). Fomin and his colleagues shared the ordeals of the First World War and the Civil war. However, they not only managed to preserve the fragile tropical plants in times of economic chaos, but also to build three new greenhouses, and repaired the tropical house. In 1922 Aleksander Fomin founded the botany department at Botanical Garden, that was reorganized in 1927 into Scientific-Research Botany Institute (now the Institute of Botany named after Kholodny, Academy of Sciences of Ukraine). When Fomin died in 1935, the Garden received his name.

== Gallery ==
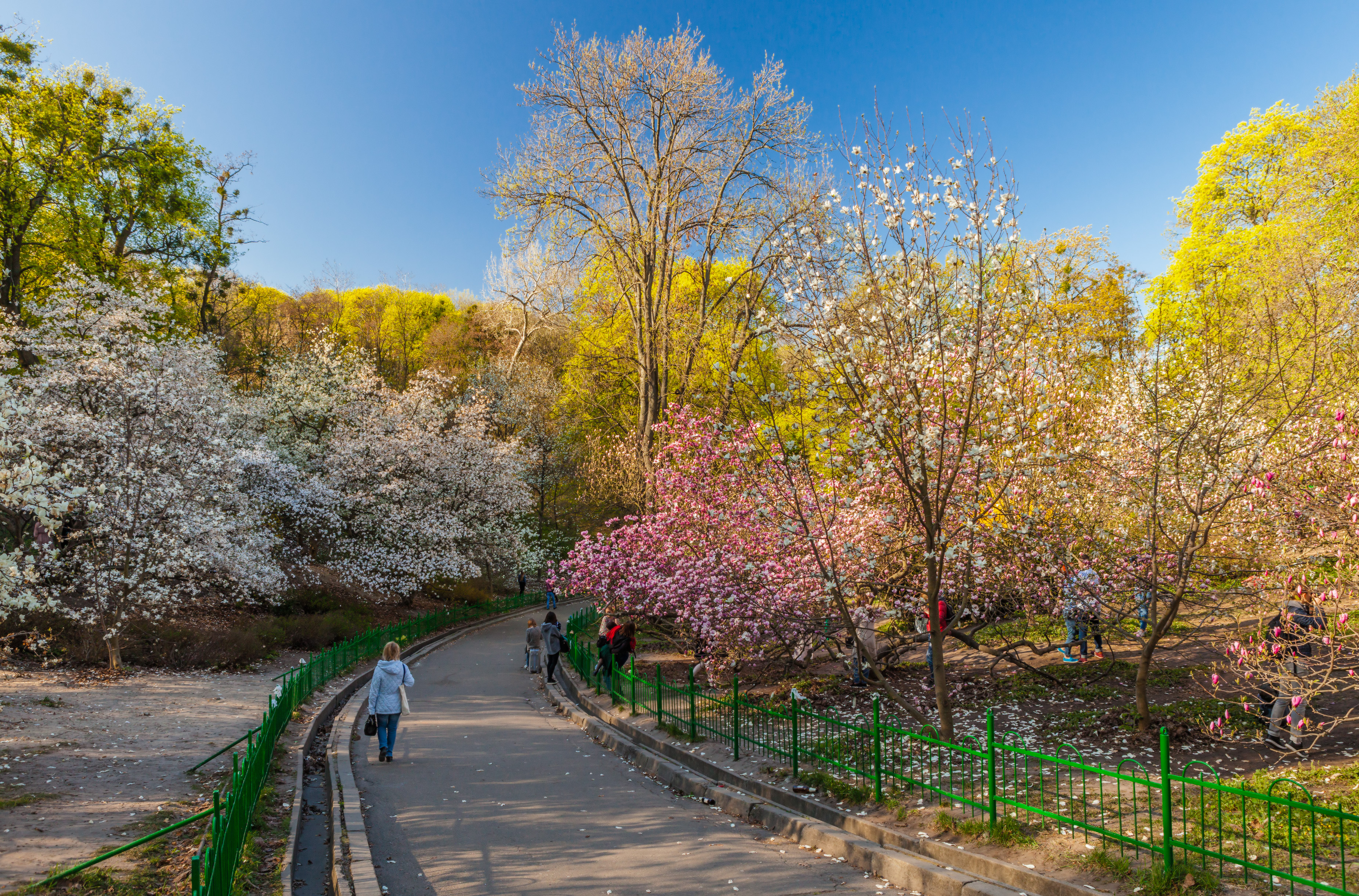
Magnolias in the garden

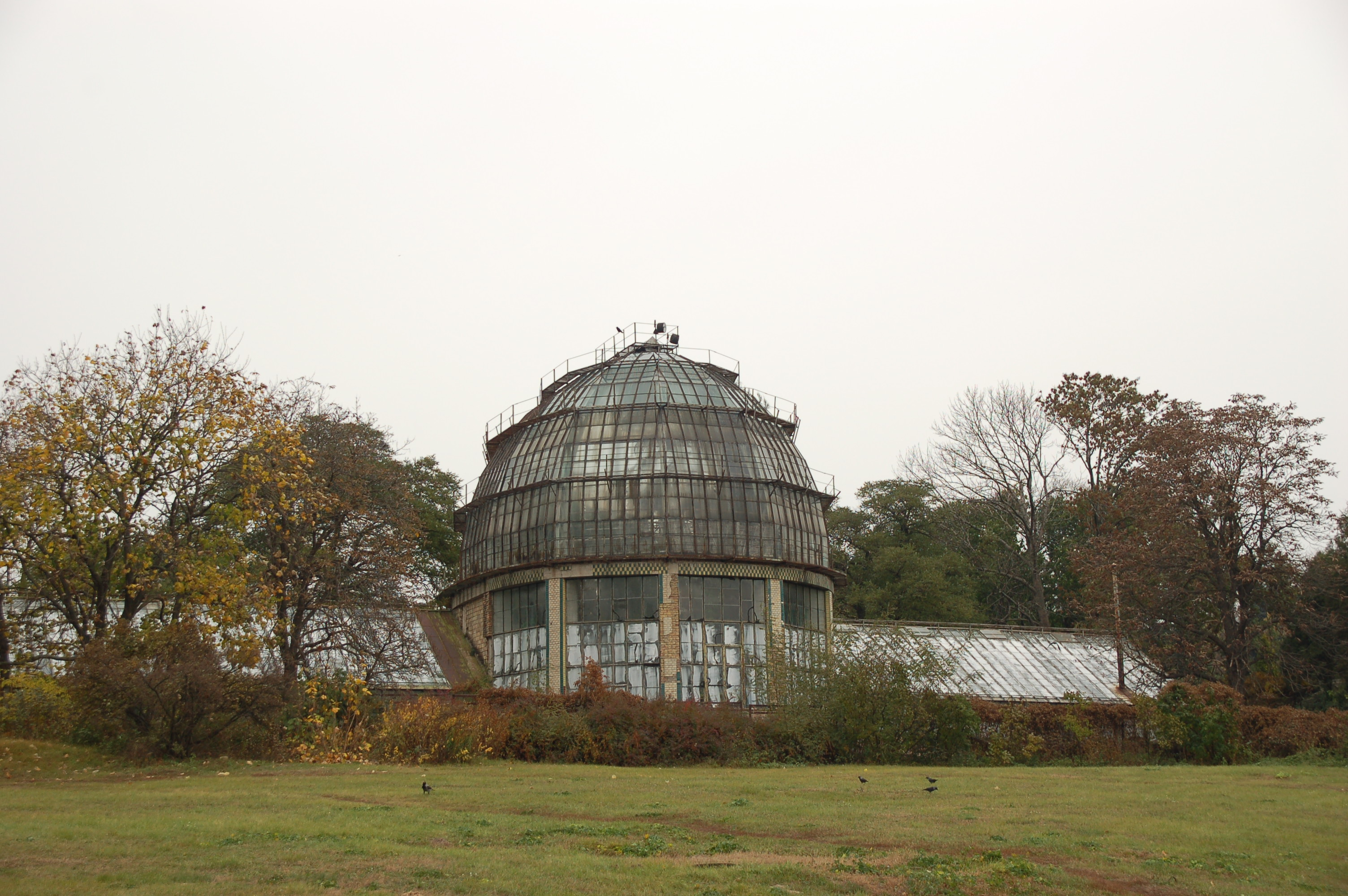
Greenhouse

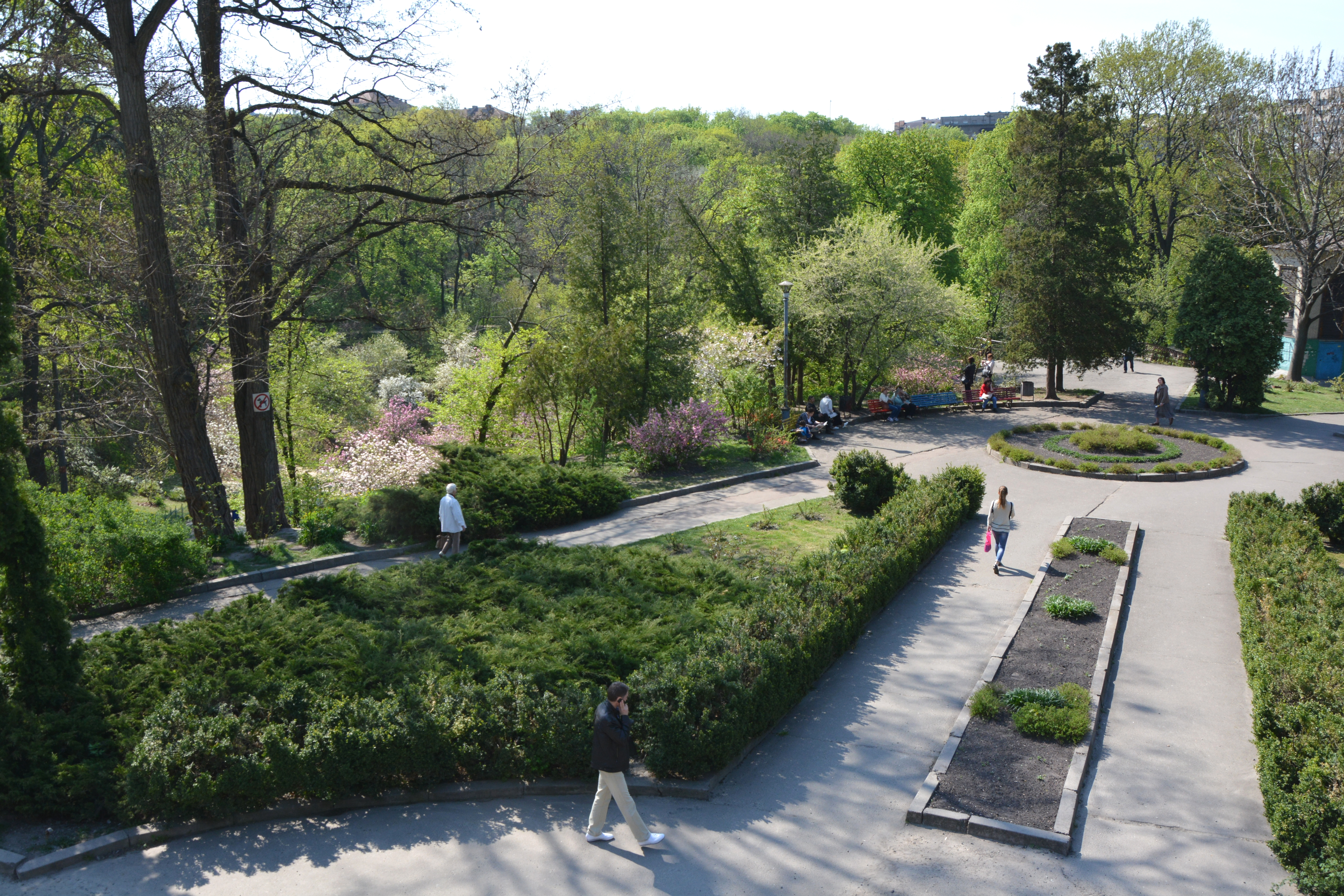

== Interesting facts ==
- In 1874, Kobzar Ostap Veresai performed his songs for the participants of the Archaeological Congress held at the Botanical Garden.
- In 1908 – 1913 the Botanical Garden housed a zoo.
