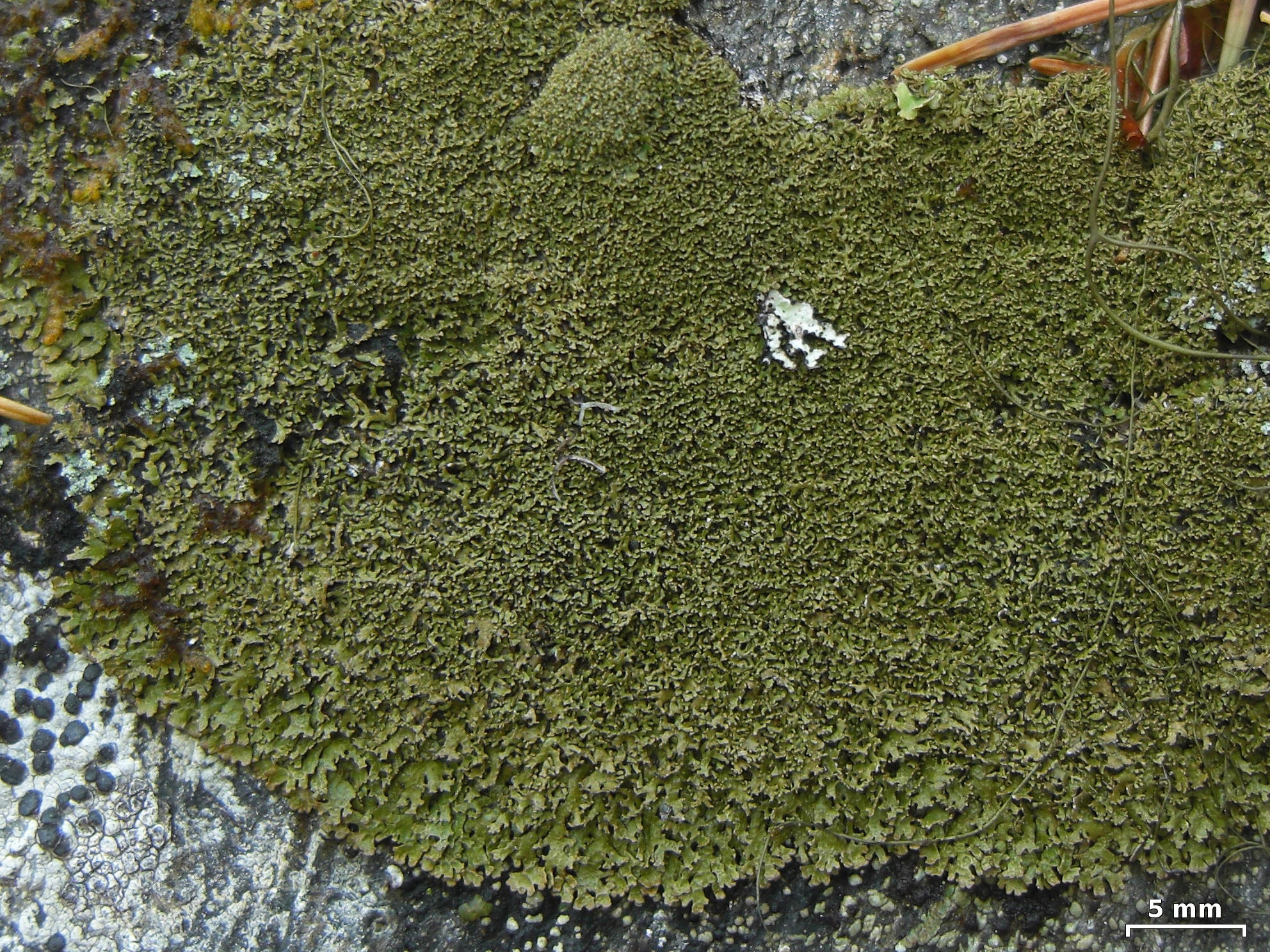

Conservation status
- Secure (NatureServe)

Scientific classification
- Kingdom: Fungi
- Division: Ascomycota
- Class: Lecanoromycetes
- Order: Lecanorales
- Family: Parmeliaceae
- Genus: Montanelia
- Species: M. panniformis

Binomial name
- Montanelia panniformis (Nyl.) Divakar, A.Crespo, Wedin & Essl. (2012)

Synonyms
- List: Parmelia olivacea var. panniformis Nyl. (1859); Parmelia prolixa f. panniformis (Nyl.) Nyl. (1860); Parmelia dendritica var. panniformis (Nyl.) Bagl. & Carestia (1865); Imbricaria prolixa var. panniformis (Nyl.) Arnold (1870); Parmelia olivacea f. panniformis (Nyl.) Th.Fr. (1871); Parmelia prolixa subsp. panniformis (Nyl.) Vain. (1878); Parmelia panniformis (Nyl.) Vain. (1881); Imbricaria olivacea var. panniformis (Nyl.) Hazsl. (1884); Melanelia panniformis (Nyl.) Essl. (1978); Imbricaria pannariiformis (Nyl. ex Lamy) Arnold (1882)

= Montanelia panniformis =

Species of lichen

Montanelia panniformis, commonly known as the shingle camouflage lichen, is a species of saxicolous (rock-dwelling) foliose lichen in the family Parmeliaceae. It has a mostly circumboreal distribution in Asia, Europe, and North America.

== Taxonomy ==
Montanelia panniformis was originally described as Parmelia prolixa f. panniformis by William Nylander in 1860. His description compared the new form to Parmelia saxatilis and emphasised its key characteristics, including a thinner thallus, shorter lobes, and a tightly overlapping (imbricate) and crowded growth pattern. Nylander noted the lichen to be known from northern Europe, and said it was relatively common around Stockholm, Sweden, where the type specimen was collected. The species was later transferred to the genus Melanelia by Theodore L. Esslinger in 1978. In 2012, molecular phylogenetic studies by Divakar and colleagues demonstrated that this species, along with several other related taxa previously classified in Melanelia, formed a distinct lineage separate from Melanelia sensu stricto. This led to the establishment of the new genus Montanelia, with M. panniformis designated as its type species.

More recent molecular studies published in 2015 revealed that what was traditionally considered M. panniformis actually consists of at least two distinct species-level lineages: M. panniformis sensu stricto ("in the strict sense") and a cryptic lineage referred to as "M. panniformis A". The split between these lineages was estimated to have occurred during the Miocene around 7.2 million years ago. While M. panniformis sensu stricto has a broad intercontinental distribution throughout the Northern Hemisphere, "M. panniformis A" appears to be restricted to northwestern North America and eastern Asia. Despite their genetic distinctness, preliminary morphological comparisons have not yet revealed any reliable diagnostic traits to distinguish between these two lineages.

The creation of Montanelia was supported by both molecular data and morphological characteristics that distinguish it from related genera. Unlike other brown parmelioid lichens such as Melanelia, Melanohalea, and Melanelixia, Montanelia species are characterised by having short narrow lobes with plane to convex margins, flat effigurate pseudocyphellae on the upper surface, and the presence of orcinol depsides in their chemistry.

== Habitat and distribution ==
Montanelia panniformis has a circumboreal distribution in Asia, Europe, and North America. It is widely distributed in Europe, having been reported in 23 countries there. In North America, its scattered range extends north to Alaska and the Northwest Territories. It is known from a single location in Baja California, Mexico. Although the lichen is typically saxicolous, in rare instances it has been recorded on bark or wood.
