= University of Tartu Botanical Garden =

Botanical garden in Tartu, Estonia

Coordinates: 58°23′5.74″N 26°43′15.61″E

Drone video of University of Tartu Botanical garden in October 2021

University of Tartu Botanical Garden (Estonian: Tartu Ülikooli Botaanikaaed), is a botanical garden in Tartu, Estonia. It belongs to the University of Tartu.

The Garden was established in 1803, belonging to the Imperial University of Dorpat. Originally, it was located at Vanemuise street near what is now the Vanemuine Small Theatre House. In 1806, the garden was relocated to a more suitable site, on a former bastion at Lai street on the northern side of the old town.

== Gallery ==
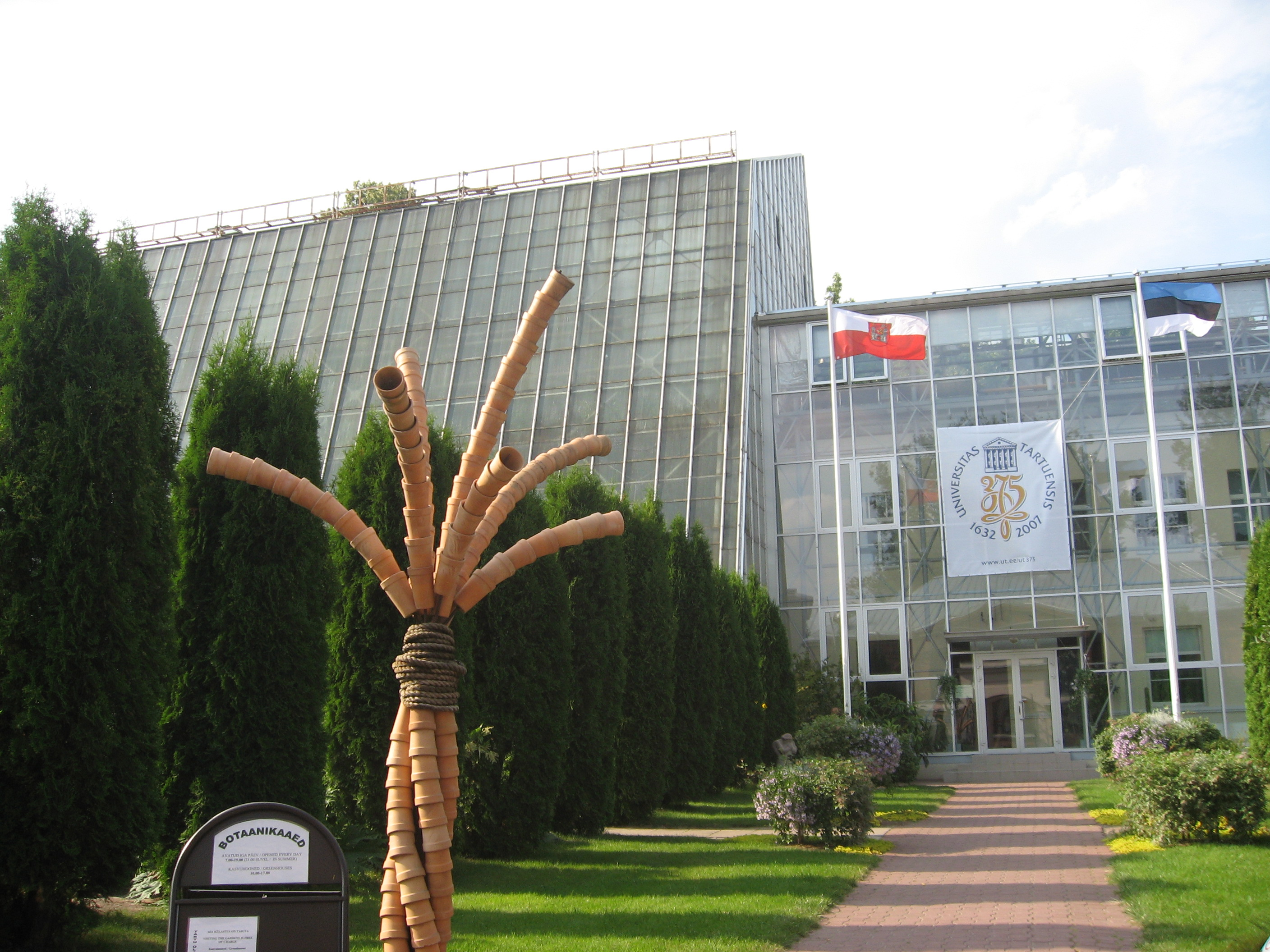
Main building

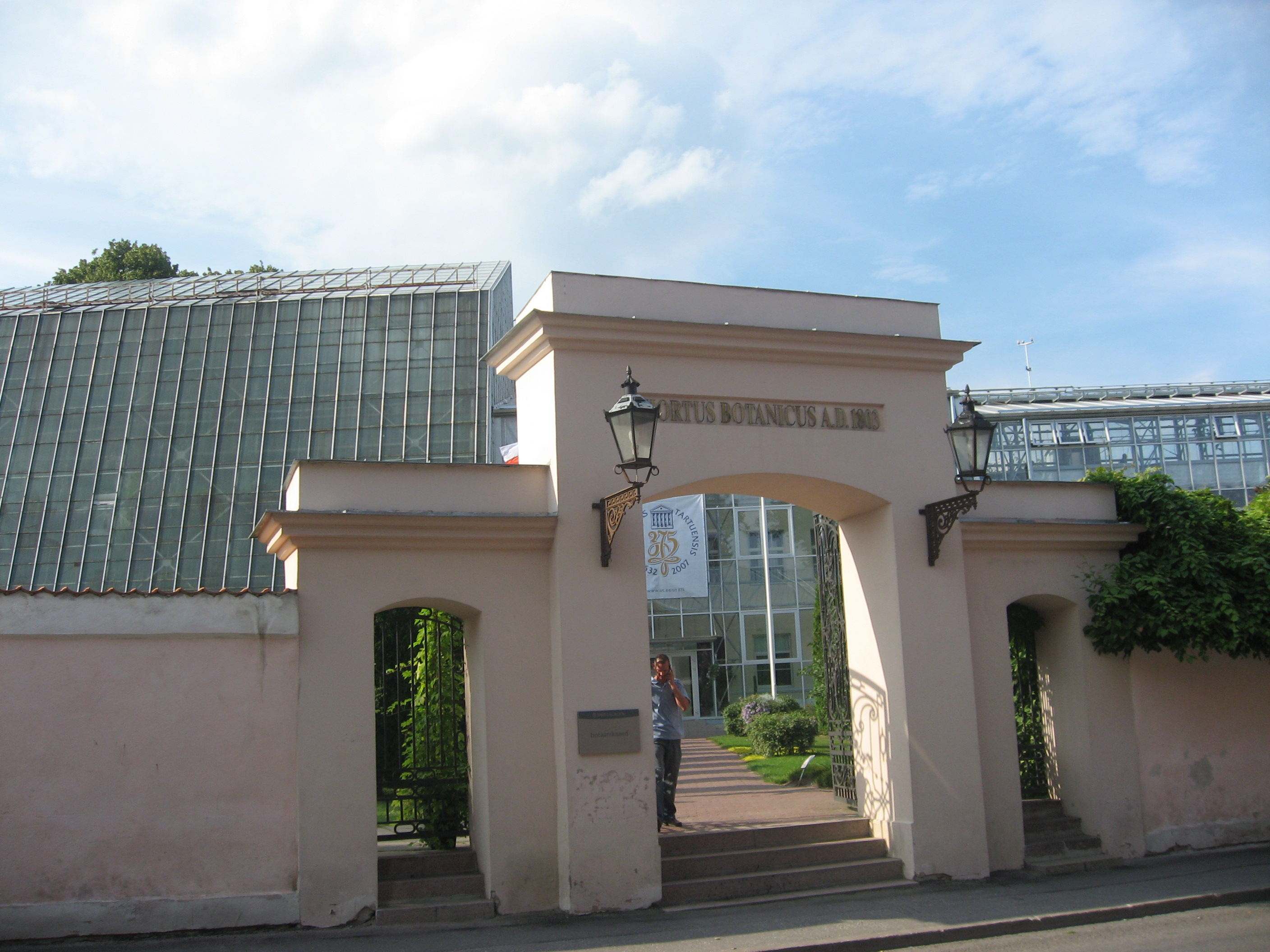
Main entrance

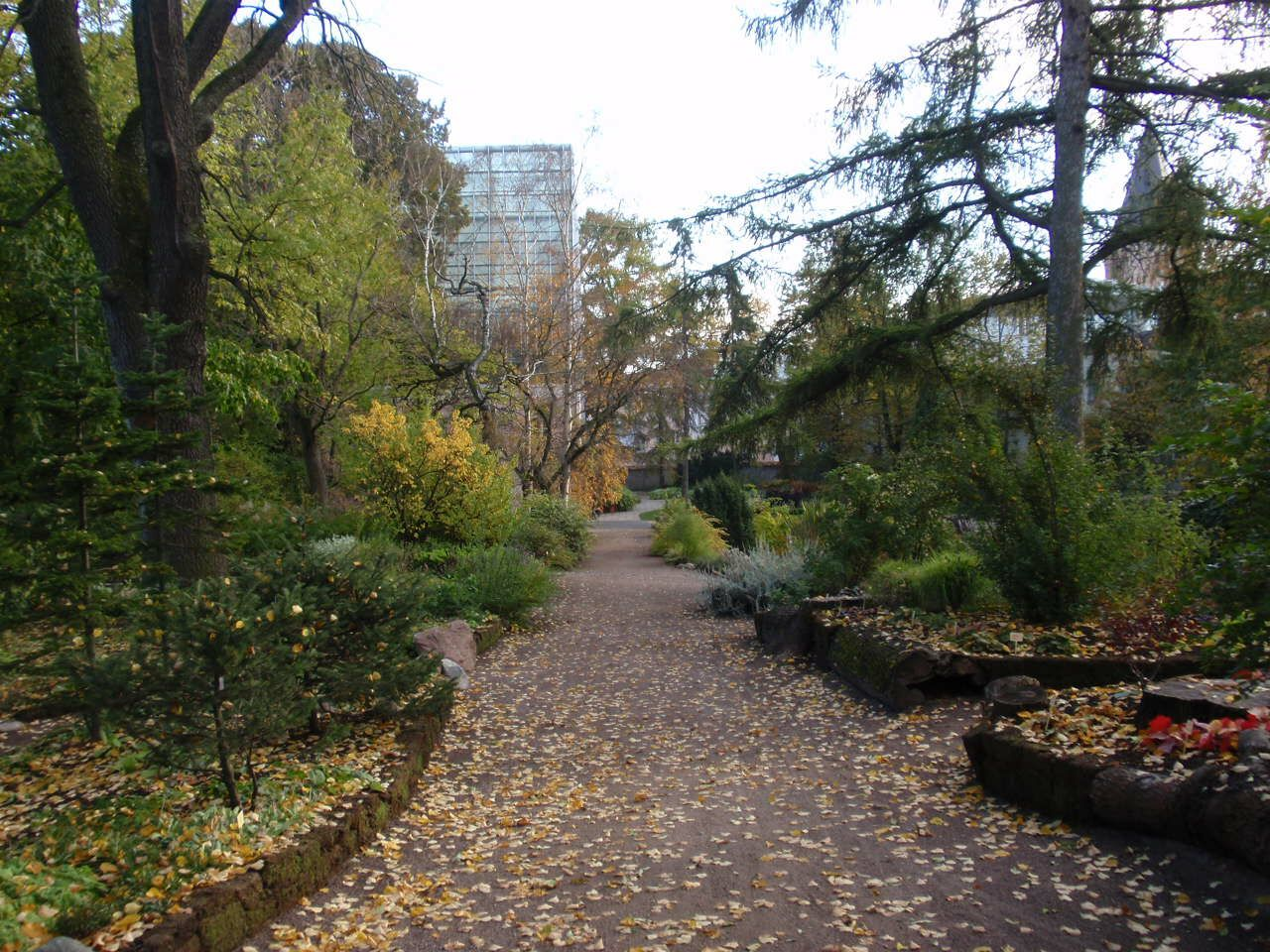
Garden in October

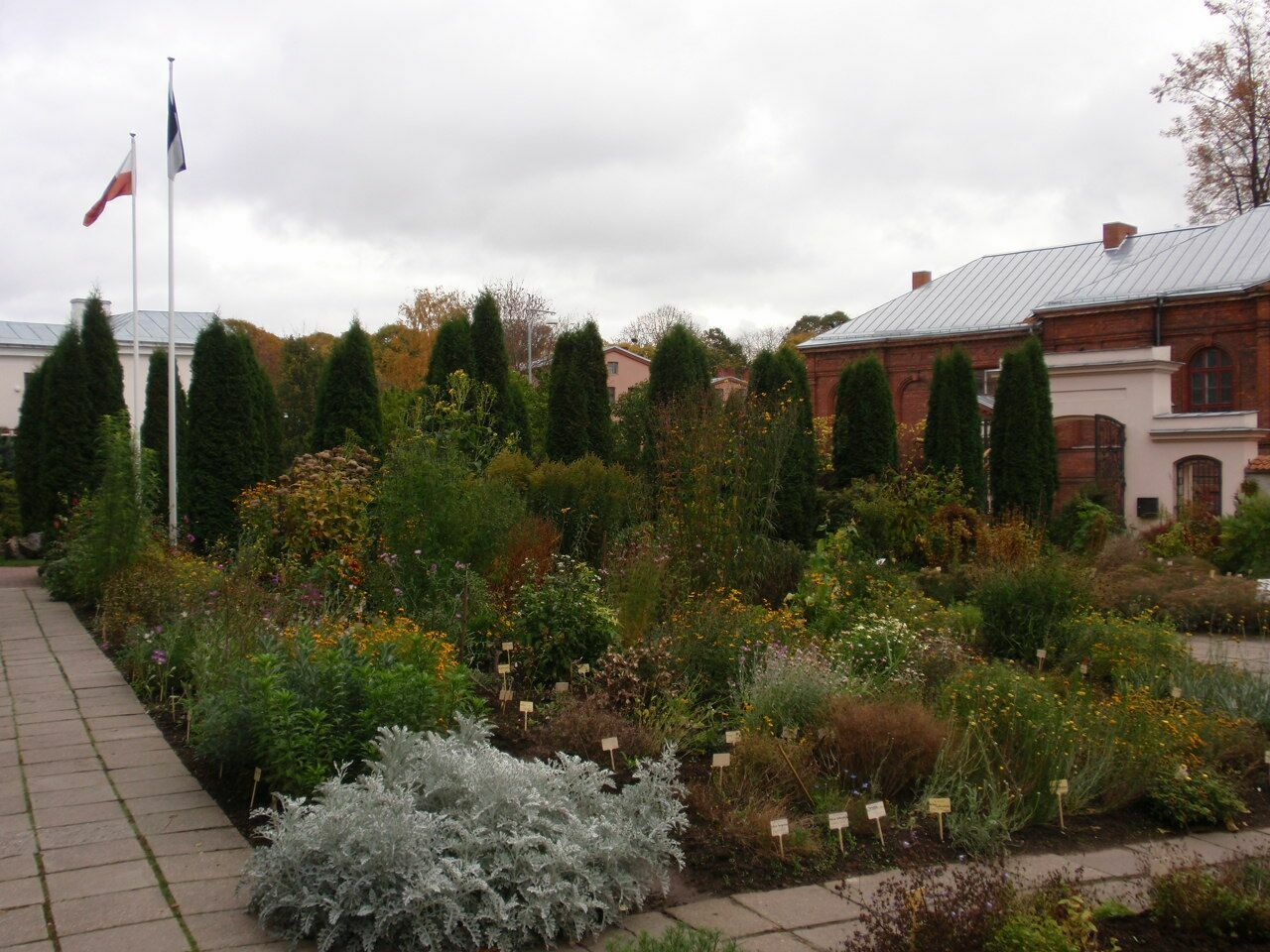

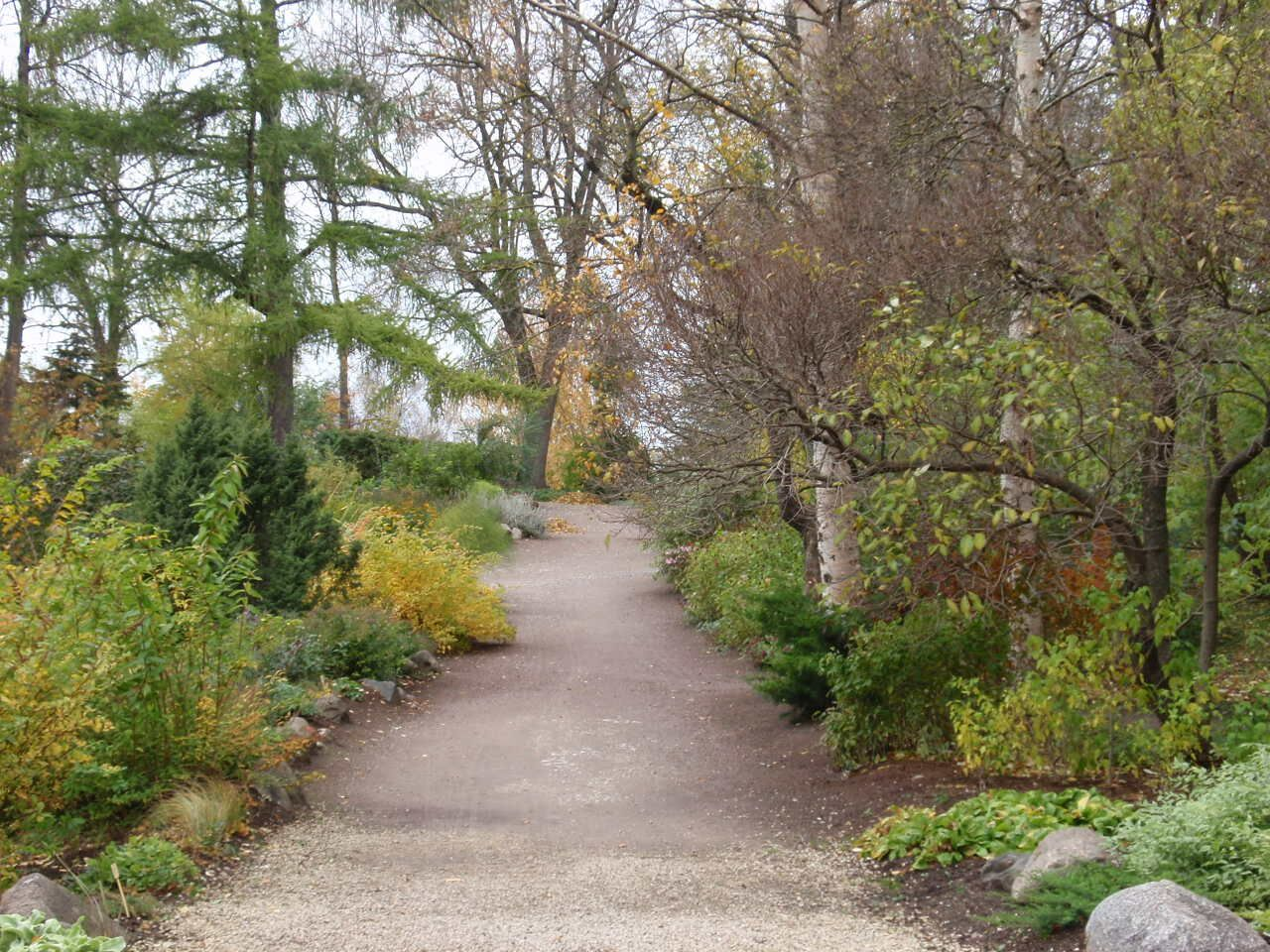

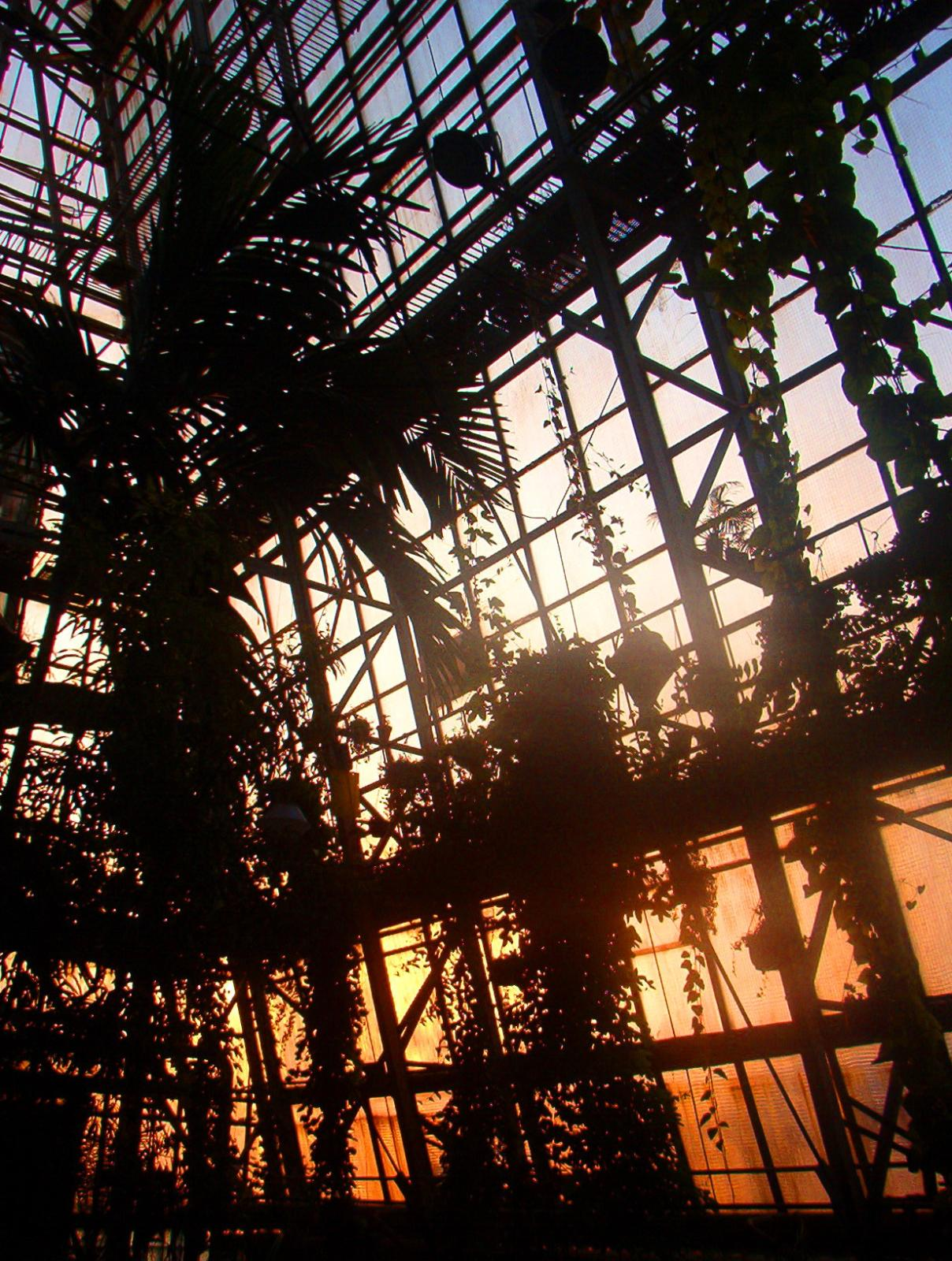
Inside the greenhouse

== See also ==
- Tallinn Botanic Garden
