= National Herbarium of Ukraine =

The National Herbarium of Ukraine is a repository of plant specimens, in Kyiv, Ukraine. It was established in 1921 by Professor O. Fomin, who was its first curator. It is now part of the M.G. Kholodny Institute of Botany, at the National Academy of Sciences of Ukraine, Kyiv, Ukraine.

Its collection of 2,040,000 specimens includes a number of type specimens, found both in Ukraine and elsewhere, by Ukrainian botanists.

The herbarium is known by the short code KW, with specific sections being known as:

- KW-A - Algotheca (algae)
- KW-B - Bryophytes
- KW-L - Lichens
- KW-M - Mycology herbarium (fungi and fungus-like organisms)
- KW-P - Palynotheca (pollen)

In October 2022, during the Russian invasion of Ukraine, the herbarium was damaged by a Russian missile strike.
