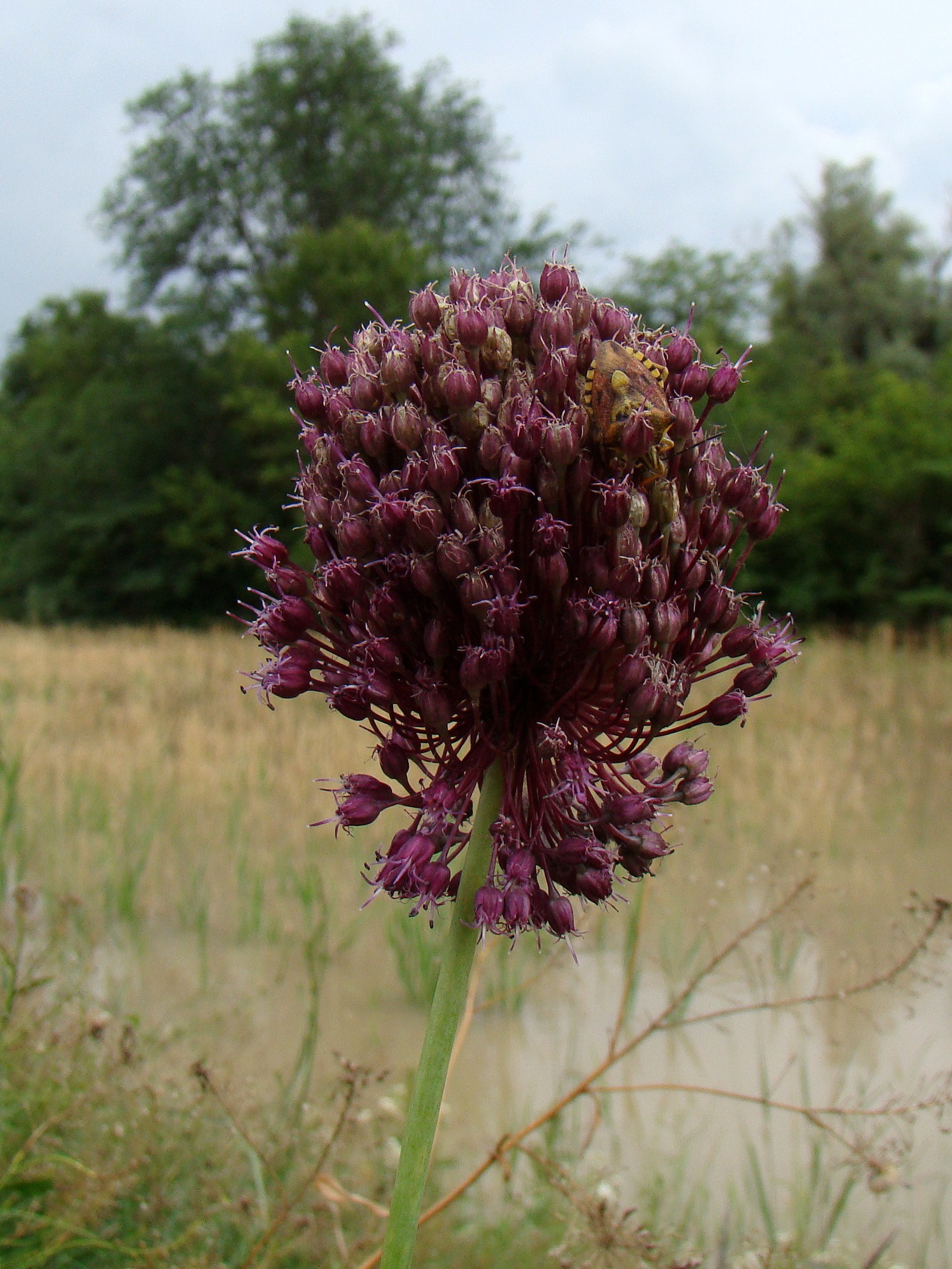
- Allium atroviolaceum found in Russia, Krasnodar Krai, Ust-Labinsk, banks of Kuban River

Scientific classification
- Kingdom: Plantae
- Clade: Embryophytes
- Clade: Tracheophytes
- Clade: Spermatophytes
- Clade: Angiosperms
- Clade: Monocots
- Order: Asparagales
- Family: Amaryllidaceae
- Subfamily: Allioideae
- Genus: Allium
- Subgenus: A. subg. Allium
- Species: A. atroviolaceum

Binomial name
- Allium atroviolaceum Boiss.

Synonyms
- Allium ampeloprasum var. atroviolaceum (Boiss.) Regel; Allium ampeloprasum subsp. atroviolaceum (Boiss.) K.Richt.; Allium atroviolaceum var. caucasicum Sommier & Levier; Allium atroviolaceum var. firmotunicatum (Fomin) Grossh.; Allium atroviolaceum var. ruderale Grossh.; Allium firmotunicatum Fomin

= Allium atroviolaceum =

Broadleaf wild leek

Species of flowering plant

Allium atroviolaceum is a species of flowering plant in the Amaryllidaceae family. it is commonly called the broadleaf wild leek, and is native to Iran, Iraq, Afghanistan, Syria, Lebanon, Saudi Arabia, Turkmenistan, Turkey, Georgia, Armenia, Azerbaijan, southern European Russia and the Caucasus, but widely cultivated in other regions as a food source and for its ornamental value. The species is sparingly naturalized in parts of the United States (Illinois, Kentucky, Virginia, and North and South Carolina) and also in southeastern Europe (Italy, Greece, the Czech Republic, Slovakia, Hungary, Ukraine and the Balkans).

Allium atroviolaceum is a perennial herb producing a large round bulb. Scape is up to 100 cm (39 in) long. Leaves are broadly linear. Umbel is spherical with many purple or red-violet flowers crowded together.
