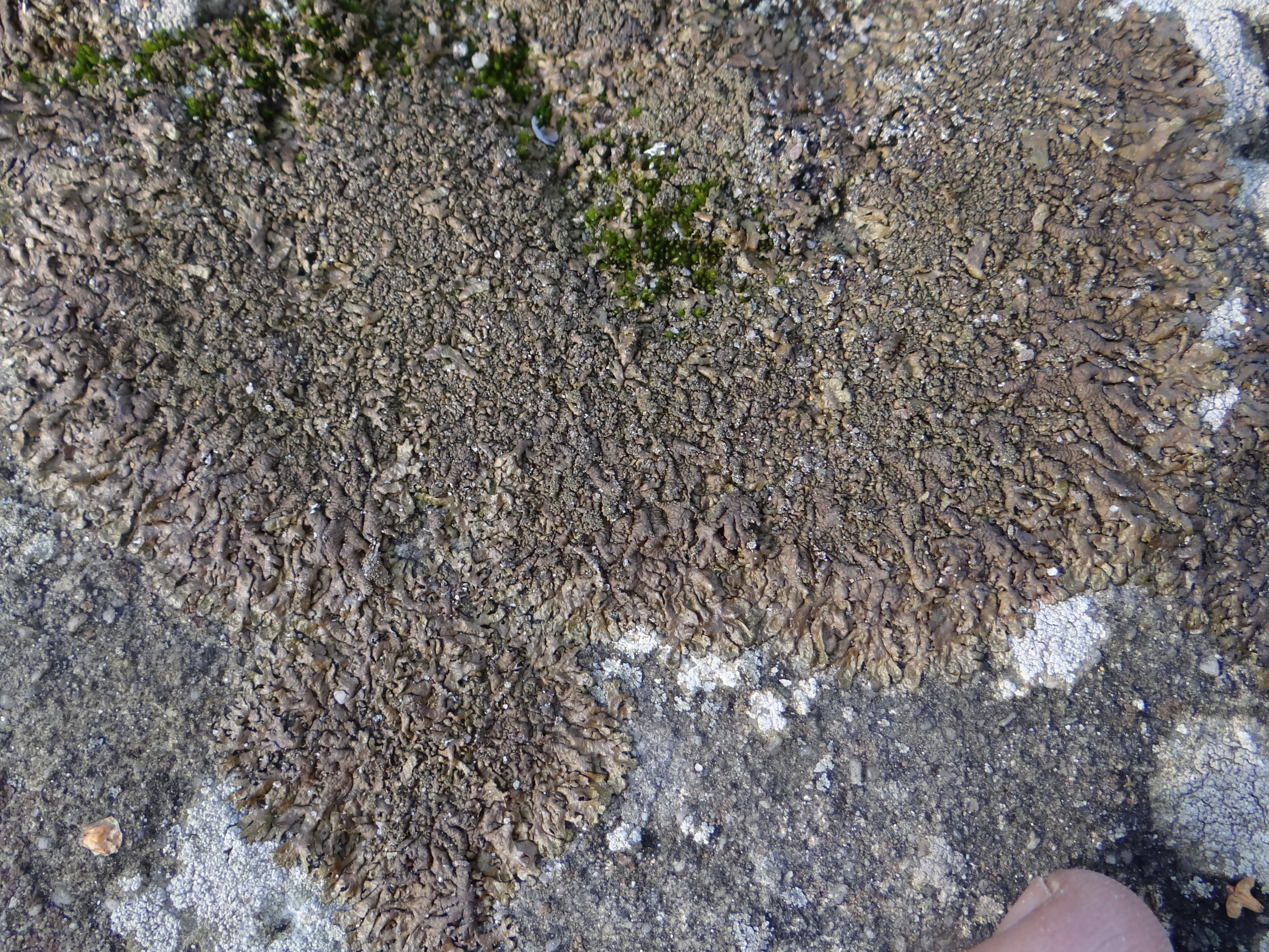
- location: Poland

Conservation status
- Secure (NatureServe)

Scientific classification
- Kingdom: Fungi
- Division: Ascomycota
- Class: Lecanoromycetes
- Order: Lecanorales
- Family: Parmeliaceae
- Genus: Montanelia
- Species: M. disjuncta

Binomial name
- Montanelia disjuncta (Erichsen) Divakar, A.Crespo, Wedin & Essl. (2012)

Synonyms
- Parmelia disjuncta Erichsen (1939); Melanelia disjuncta (Erichsen) Essl. (1978); Parmelia granulosa Lynge (1932); Melanelia granulosa Essl. (1987)

= Montanelia disjuncta =

Species of lichen-forming fungus

Montanelia disjuncta, the mealy camouflage lichen, is a species of saxicolous (rock-dwelling), foliose lichen in the family Parmeliaceae. It occurs in Europe and North America.

== Taxonomy ==
It was described as a new species in 1939 by the German lichenologist Christian Erichsen, who classified it in the genus Parmelia. Theodore Esslinger transferred it to the newly circumscribed Melanelia in 1978. The taxon was reclassified as a member of the new genus Montanelia in 2012, following a molecular phylogenetics-informed restructuring of this group of brown parmelioid lichens.

A later study of internal transcribed spacer variation found substantial intraspecific diversity in Montanelia disjuncta, recovering 12 haplotypes across the material examined. Despite this variation, the authors found no clear geographic structure, and the molecular differences did not correspond with morphological, anatomical, or chemical characters.

== Description ==
A distinguishing characteristic of this species is the coarse and dark isidia-like soredia that tend to accumulate in older parts of the thallus surface. The black thallus undersurface is attached to its substrate by numerous rhizines. All of the standard chemical spot tests are negative in this species except that it is UV+, indicating the presence of perlatolic acid and stenosporic acid.

== Habitat and distribution ==
Montanelia disjuncta grows on sun-exposed, granitic rocks. It is widely distributed in northern North America, particularly on the West Coast all the way north to Alaska and other arctic regions of the continent. In Mexico, it is known only from a single collection from the mountains of Baja California.
