= Perlatolic acid =

Lichen-derived depside

Names
- IUPAC name 2-hydroxy-4-(2-hydroxy-4-methoxy-6-pentylbenzoyl)oxy-6-pentylbenzoic acid
- Other names Perlatolinic acid

Identifiers
CAS Number	529-47-5
3D model (JSmol)	Interactive image
ChEBI	CHEBI:144187
ChEMBL	ChEMBL2006643
ChemSpider	152478
PubChem CID	174857
CompTox Dashboard (EPA)	DTXSID60200943
- InChI: InChI=1S/C25H32O7/c1-4-6-8-10-16-13-19(15-20(26)22(16)24(28)29)32-25(30)23-17(11-9-7-5-2)12-18(31-3)14-21(23)27/h12-15,26-27H,4-11H2,1-3H3,(H,28,29) Key: UTAQXQVSEKIWBB-UHFFFAOYSA-N
- SMILES: CCCCC1=C(C(=CC(=C1)OC)O)C(=O)OC2=CC(=C(C(=C2)O)C(=O)O)CCCCC

Properties
Chemical formula	C_{25}H_{32}O_{7}
Molar mass	444.5 g·mol−1
- Except where otherwise noted, data are given for materials in their standard state (at 25 °C [77 °F], 100 kPa). Infobox references

Perlatolic acid is a lichen secondary metabolite belonging to the depside class. It has been reported from several lichens, including species in the family Parmeliaceae and reindeer lichens such as Cladonia stellaris. The compound has a low first dissociation constant, which has been linked to the ability of some perlatolic acid-containing lichens to persist on very acidic substrates and under acidic air pollution. In laboratory studies, perlatolic acid derivatives have shown phytotoxic/herbicidal effects, and perlatolic acid itself has shown in vitro antiviral activity against human coronaviruses.

== Occurrence ==
Perlatolic acid is a phenolic depside found in several Parmeliaceae lichens. It has been documented in Canoparmelia pustulifera and Cetrelia monachorum, where it occurs as part of the species' secondary metabolite profile. Perlatolic acid has also been isolated from some reindeer lichens, including Cladina confusa, Cladonia stellaris, and Cladina macaronesica. In Cladonia stellaris, usnic acid is concentrated in the outermost layer, whereas perlatolic acid occurs in the medulla.

In a climate-chamber experiment simulating a growing season, an ambient +4 °C warming treatment reduced perlatolic acid concentration in Cladonia stellaris by about 14% relative to ambient conditions. Across the experiment, perlatolic acid concentrations declined to roughly 70–80% of the starting value, which the authors discuss as potentially consistent with dilution from growth and low or absent synthesis under the chamber conditions. Earlier growth-cabinet experiments with thallus fragments of Cladonia stellaris likewise found that perlatolic acid concentration depended on light availability: levels were similar to controls under high light, but decreased significantly under lower illumination, whereas usnic acid showed no significant change across the same treatments.

== Synthesis ==
Perlatolic acid has been prepared synthetically as part of a wider study on para-olivetol depsides. In this work, olivetolcarboxylic acid (2,4-dihydroxy-6-pentylbenzoic acid) was converted into suitably protected phenolic building blocks by benzylating the phenolic and carboxy groups. The depside linkage was then formed by condensing a benzyl ester of olivetolcarboxylic acid with a related methoxy-substituted benzoic acid using trifluoroacetic anhydride as the coupling reagent, giving a benzyl-protected perlatolic ester (benzyl perlatolate). Final removal of the benzyl protecting groups by catalytic hydrogenolysis over palladium on carbon afforded perlatolic acid in high yield.

The same protecting-group strategy allowed the author to obtain a series of related olivetol-derived depsides, including anziaic, imbricaric and planaic acids, as well as the mono-O-methyl derivatives 2-O-methylperlatolic acid and 2'-O-methylperlatolic acid. Comparison of the synthetic products with natural material by melting point, thin-layer chromatography and spectroscopic data confirmed the structure of perlatolic acid and provided reference compounds for chromatographic identification of its methylated analogues in lichens.

== Chemical properties ==
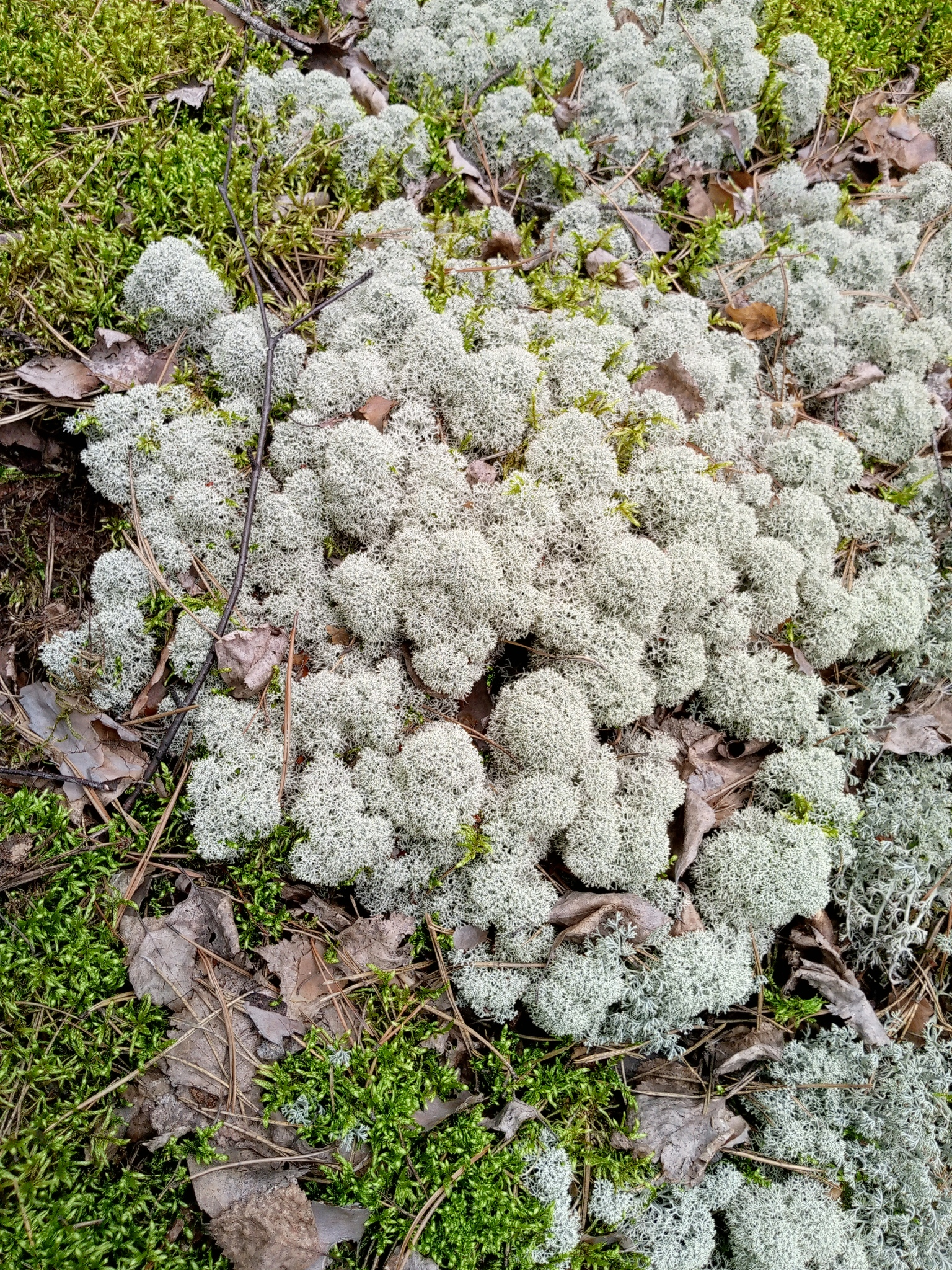
The reindeer lichen Cladonia stellaris is one species from which perlatolic acid has been isolated.

Perlatolic acid is a lichen product with the molecular formula C_{25}H_{32}O_{7} (relative molecular mass 444.51). It forms needle-like crystals from methanol–water mixtures and melts at about 107–108 °C. In simple microchemical tests, ethanolic solutions of the acid give a violet colour with ferric chloride, indicating phenolic hydroxyl groups. In alcoholic solution, perlatolic acid undergoes alcoholysis to give 2,4-dihydroxy-6-n-pentylbenzoic acid together with a series of alkyl 2-hydroxy-4-methoxy-6-n-pentylbenzoates and the phenolic fragment 1,3-dihydroxy-5-n-pentylbenzene (olivetol). In a study of Cladina macaronesica, the authors cautioned that some simpler phenolics may be artefacts formed by degradation of perlatolic acid during processing, and they experimentally converted perlatolic acid into mono-aryl products by refluxing it with silica gel in benzene, consistent with its "great lability". Perlatolic acid has a very low first dissociation constant (pKa1 = 2.7; measured in methanol), and its occurrence in several lichen species has been linked to growth on strongly acidic substrata and tolerance of acidic air pollution.

Its ultraviolet spectrum in methanol shows absorption maxima in the near-ultraviolet region, and infrared spectra display bands consistent with aromatic rings, hydroxyl groups and carboxylic or ester carbonyl functions. Proton and carbon-13 NMR data obtained in deuterated dimethyl sulfoxide and acetone reveal signals from a methoxy group, several aliphatic methylene units and an aromatic system bearing oxygenated substituents. The mass spectrum shows multiple fragment peaks; the base peak is at m/z 164. Perlatolic acid can be converted into the dimethyl ether methyl di-O-methylperlatolate by treatment with methyl iodide and potassium carbonate; this derivative crystallises from methanol as needles melting at about 57 °C and is convenient for further analytical work.

Under dry heating conditions perlatolic acid decomposes above its melting point. In a comparative study of lichen depsides, heating solid perlatolic acid at about 160 °C for 1 h gave a mixture of olivetol, the bis-olivetol derivative anziol, and the ether 2'-O-methylperlatolol as identifiable products of the pyrolysate. In the same work, measurements of carbon dioxide evolution showed that perlatolic acid decarboxylates more slowly than lecanoric, evernic, planaic and sekikaic acids under comparable conditions, indicating relatively low thermal lability among this series of depsides.

== Biological activity ==
Perlatolic acid and several simple esters derived from it have been tested for phytotoxic and potential herbicidal effects. In germination and seedling assays using lettuce (Lactuca sativa) and onion (Allium cepa), perlatolic acid itself showed only low inhibition of germination, whereas some of its alkyl 2-hydroxy-4-methoxy-6-n-pentylbenzoate derivatives caused marked reductions in root and shoot growth. In particular, the iso-propyl and sec-butyl esters reduced root and hypocotyl elongation and dry mass in lettuce seedlings, while the n-butyl, n-pentyl and n-hexyl esters delayed germination and inhibited root and coleoptile growth in onion to an extent comparable with commercial herbicides used as positive controls in the same bioassays. The authors proposed these esters as model molecules for the development of natural herbicides targeting dicotyledonous and monocotyledonous weeds.

In cell-culture screening against human coronaviruses, perlatolic acid showed antiviral activity against HCoV-229E, with micromolar inhibitory concentrations and no detectable toxicity at active doses; time-of-addition experiments indicated that inhibition occurred after virus entry, consistent with an effect on a post-inoculation (replication-associated) step. It was also active against SARS-CoV-2 in vitro, producing a dose-dependent reduction in infection without obvious toxicity.
