= Cetrelia sayanensis =

Scientific classification
- Domain: Eukaryota
- Kingdom: Fungi
- Division: Ascomycota
- Class: Lecanoromycetes
- Order: Lecanorales
- Family: Parmeliaceae
- Genus: Cetrelia
- Species: C. sayanensis

Binomial name
- Cetrelia sayanensis Otnyukova, Stepanov & Elix (2009)

Species of lichen

Cetrelia sayanensis is a species of foliose lichen in the family Parmeliaceae. Found in Europe, it was formally described as a new species in 2009 by lichenologists Tatyana Otnyukova, Nikolay Stepanov, and John Alan Elix. The type was collected along the Kulumys ridge on the West Sayan Mountains of southern Siberia. Here it was found growing on the bark of an old stem of Sorbus sibirica, at an altitude of 800 m (2,600 ft). It has also been collected in several neighbouring areas, all at altitudes between 400–930 m (1,310–3,050 ft), with the bark of Abies, Betula, Salix, and Sorbus as the typical substrates. In 2019, the lichen was recorded from Austria, its first reported occurrence in middle Europe.

The lichen has a foliose (leafy), gray to greenish-gray thallus measuring 3–6 in (7.6–15.2 cm) wide, comprising overlapping lobes that are 0.3–1.5 cm (0.1–0.6 in) wide. The upper thallus surface is somewhat shiny, and has pseudocyphellae, pustules, and soredia. Its ascospores are ellipsoid to roughly spherical, measuring 12–16 by 10–12 μm.

Cetrelia sayanensis is similar to other Cetrelia species that produce soredia, including C. cetrarioides, C. chicitae, C. olivetorum, and C. monachorum. Unlike these species, however, C. sayanensis have pustulate-capitate soralia, meaning that the soralia arise from pustules (blister-like bumps) on the thallus surface. The major secondary compound of C. sayanensis is imbricaric acid, while minor compounds include atranorin, perlatolic acid, divaricatic acid, and anziaic acid.
