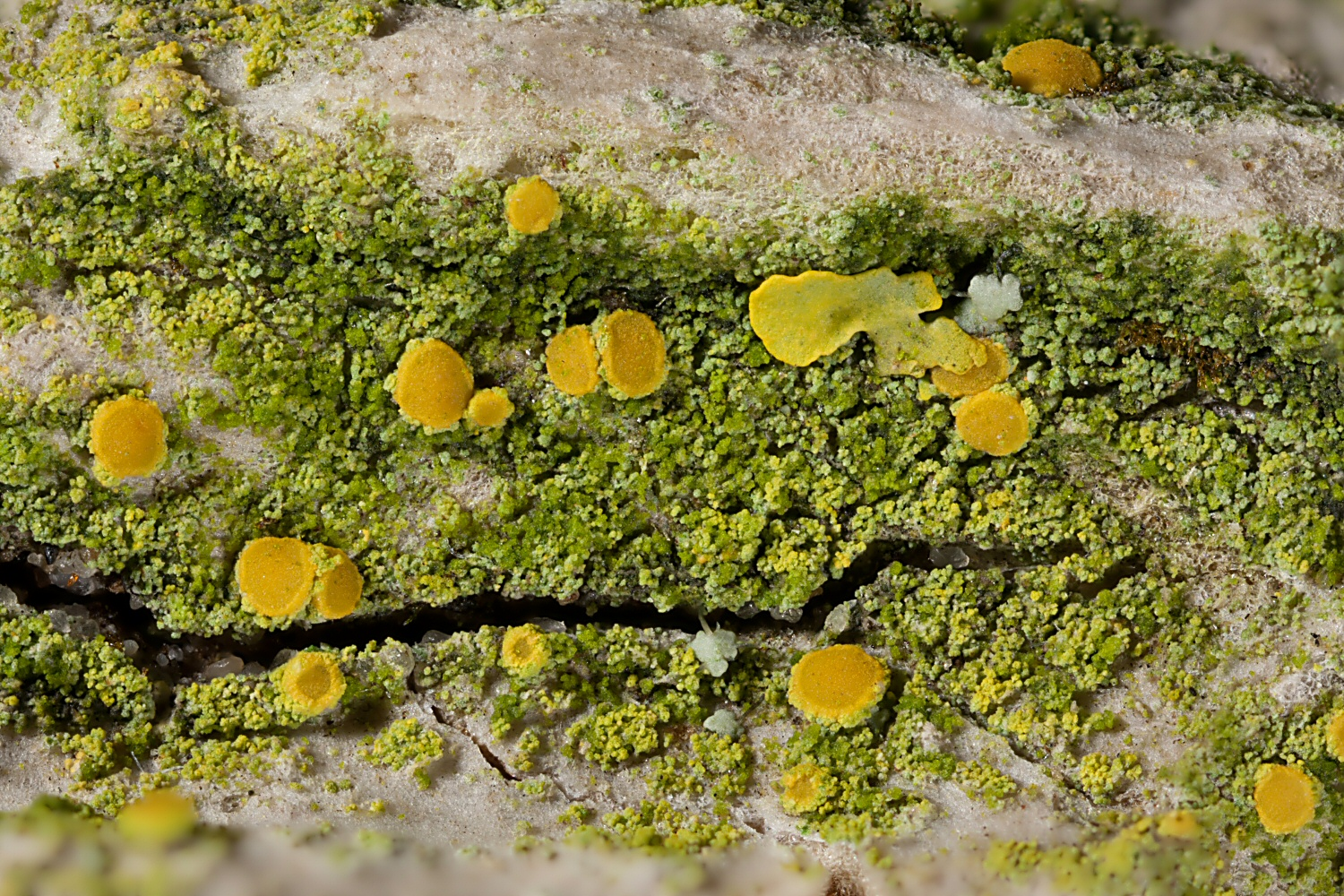

Scientific classification
- Kingdom: Fungi
- Division: Ascomycota
- Class: Lecanoromycetes
- Order: Teloschistales
- Family: Teloschistaceae
- Genus: Scythioria
- Species: S. phlogina

Binomial name
- Scythioria phlogina (Ach.) S.Y.Kondr., Kärnefelt, Elix, A.Thell & Hur (2014)

Synonyms
- List: Parmelia citrina var. phlogina Ach. (1803); Blastenia phlogina (Ach.) B. de Lesd. (1914); Callopisma citrinum f. phloginum (Ach.) Kremp. (1861); Callopisma phloginum (Ach.) Arnold (1871); Caloplaca citrina f. phlogina (Ach.) D.Hawksw. (1969); Caloplaca citrina f. phlogina (Ach.) B. de Lesd. (1911); Caloplaca citrina var. phlogina (Ach.) H.Olivier (1884); Caloplaca phlogina (Ach.) Flagey (1884); Caloplaca phlogina f. phlogina (Ach.) Flagey (1884); Caloplaca phlogina var. phlogina (Ach.) Flagey (1884); Lecanora phlogina (Ach.) Nyl. (1857); Lecanora phlogina var. phlogina (Ach.) Nyl. (1857); Lecidea phlogina (Ach.) Hue (1913); Placodium cerinum var. phloginum (Ach.) Branth & Rostr. (1869); Placodium phloginum (Ach.) A.L.Sm. (1918); Placodium phloginum f. phloginum (Ach.) A.L.Sm. (1918); Polycauliona phlogina (Ach.) Arup (2013); Xanthoria parietina f. phlogina (Ach.) Mig. (1924); Xanthoria parietina subsp. phlogina (Ach.) Sandst. (1912); Xanthoria phlogina (Ach.) Arnold (1891); Caloplaca scythica Khodos. & Søchting (1998)

= Scythioria phlogina =

Species of lichen-forming fungus

Scythioria phlogina is a species of lichen-forming fungus in the family Teloschistaceae. First described by Erik Acharius in 1803 as a variety of Parmelia citrina, it has had a long nomenclatural history, passing through genera such as Caloplaca, Xanthoria, and Polycauliona before being transferred in 2014 to the genus Scythioria on the basis of molecular phylogenetic evidence. The lichen forms a thin crustose thallus in which the small areoles are usually almost or completely dissolved into soredia. It occurs in two main colour forms: one with yellow soralia coloured by anthraquinones and another with whitish to pale green soralia that lack anthraquinone pigmentation. Scythioria phlogina grows almost entirely on bark, favouring nutrient-rich, high-pH bark of broad-leaved trees such as elm, ash, and maple, though in drier steppe habitats it also occurs on plant debris, soil, and small shrubs. It is found across much of Europe, from Scandinavia and the Netherlands to the Black Sea region and the Baltic states, with additional records from Bering Island in the Russian Far East and from southern Chile.

== Taxonomy ==
The taxon was first described by Erik Acharius in his 1803 work Methodus qua omnes detectos lichenes as Parmelia citrina var. phlogina, which he characterized as having a yellow, powdery thallus with small, scattered, pale fruiting bodies (apothecia) and reported from the bark of trees. Ulf Arup later noted that the taxon had been recognized earlier by Georg Franz Hoffmann as Verrucaria flava in 1796, but because Hoffmann's original material had been lost, Arup selected a neotype from Lund in Skåne. Since its original publication, the species has had a long and unsettled nomenclatural history, having been transferred through several genera including Lecanora, Lecidea, Placodium, Callopisma, Caloplaca, Xanthoria, and Polycauliona.

In a 2006 revision published under the name Caloplaca phlogina, Arup found that the species was not closely related to C. citrina, despite their similar morphology, but instead belonged to a separate lineage allied to the Xanthoria candelaria group. In a 2010 study, Jan Vondrák and coauthors found that specimens described as Caloplaca scythica from Black Sea salt marshes belonged to the same well-supported internal transcribed spacer (ITS) lineage as C. phlogina and differed mainly in the colour of the soralia. They therefore reduced C. scythica to synonymy, treating the white-sorediate and yellow-sorediate forms as expressions of a single variable species.

In a broader 2014 phylogenetic revision of the subfamily Xanthorioideae (family Teloschistaceae), Sergey Kondratyuk and coauthors transferred Caloplaca phlogina to the newly erected genus Scythioria, in which it is the type species. Their analysis of ITS, LSU, and mitochondrial small-subunit sequence data recovered Scythioria as one of five newly recognized, strongly supported lineages within the subfamily. The generic name refers to the Scythian peoples of the Eurasian Steppe and also echoes Caloplaca scythica, a name previously reduced to synonymy on molecular grounds.

In a 2025 study of Teloschistaceae from the southern Rocky Mountains, Raynor and coauthors treated the species under the combination Polycauliona phlogina and included it in an ITS phylogeny. In that analysis, nine accessions identified as P. phlogina formed a well-supported clade that was sister to the newly described P. pancakeana; together, those two lineages were sister to P. flavogranulosa. Separately, Frolov and coauthors studied Teloschistales from the Commander Islands and found that four ITS sequences identified as Polycauliona phlogina fell within a monophyletic P. phlogina clade, but were not identical to previously available GenBank sequences, instead forming two additional lineages within it. The authors nevertheless retained those collections within P. phlogina.

== Description ==
The species forms a thin, crust-like thallus (vegetative body) 0.3–3 cm across, which may be greyish, pale yellow, or yellow. The thallus surface may be broken into small tile-like patches (areoles), embedded within bark or rock, but the areoles are usually almost or completely broken down into powdery reproductive granules (soredia). The soredia are typically thin and loose rather than forming a cracked surface, and the outer layer (cortex) is usually poorly developed. The soralia (patches of soredia) begin as small dot-like spots and later merge into a more continuous, mottled sorediate mass.

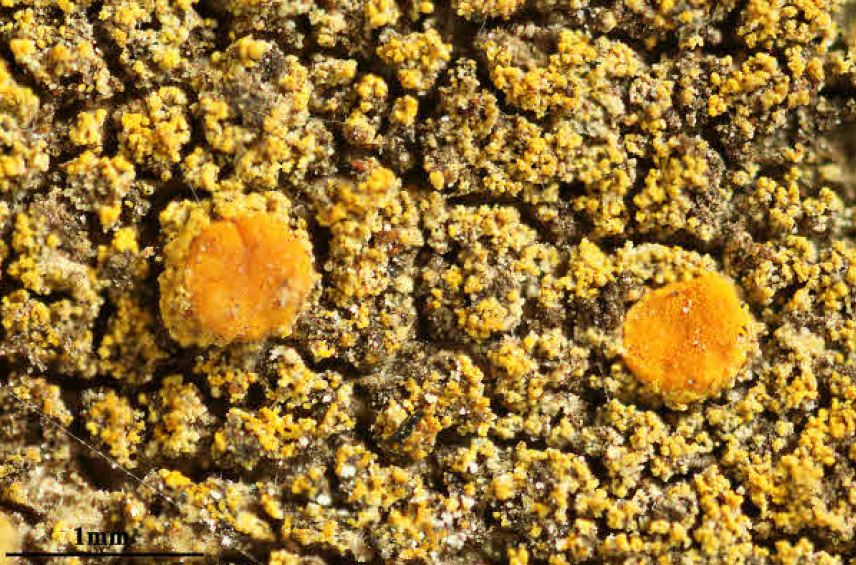
Closeup of fruiting bodies, growing on the Canary Island date palm in the Canary Islands.

Apothecia (disc-shaped fruiting bodies) are usually present, though often scattered, with yellow to orange-yellow discs that may carry a thin white powdery coating (pruina). They are zeorine in form, meaning they have a visible rim derived from the thallus, with a paraplectenchymatous thalline exciple (outer rim of rounded cells) and a prosoplectenchymatous true exciple (inner rim of elongated cells).

Scythioria phlogina occurs in two main colour forms. One has yellow soralia coloured by anthraquinones (orange pigments typical of the family), while the other has whitish to pale green soralia that lack anthraquinone pigmentation. Apart from soralia colour, the two forms are very similar in anatomy and other examined characters, including their apothecia and spores. In the pale form, anthraquinones are still present in the apothecia but are not expressed in the soralia. Chemical analyses showed that pale or grey thalli contain only low amounts of parietin, whereas more strongly coloured thalli and the apothecia contain parietin as the main anthraquinone, together with smaller amounts of fallacinal, emodin, and parietinic acid.

== Similar species ==
Older North American work on the Flavoplaca citrina group illustrates why Scythioria phlogina was long difficult to distinguish from similar yellow sorediate species. Clifford Wetmore reported that many collections showed intermediate characters, and that most eastern North American bark-dwelling material in the complex was better referred to Gyalolechia xanthostigmoidea.

Scythioria phlogina can resemble Caloplaca citrina, but the two are best separated ecologically, as S. phlogina is mainly a bark-dwelling species whereas C. citrina in Nordic material it was associated chiefly with rock, concrete, soil, and other non-bark substrates. On bark, C. flavocitrina differs in retaining a larger part of the thallus as distinct areoles instead of becoming almost completely sorediate, while Leproplaca chrysodeta differs in its more brownish-orange, leprose thallus and in lacking apothecia.

A 2025 comparison with the newly described Polycauliona pancakeana characterized Scythioria phlogina as a bark-dwelling, yellow-green species with an areolate thallus or one composed largely of vegetative propagules, and with spores 9–13 × 4–6 μm having a conspicuous isthmus 3–5 μm wide. In the same comparison, P. pancakeana was separated by its saxicolous habit, continuous mat of fine corticate granules, and reduced septum.

== Habitat and distribution ==
Scythioria phlogina is almost entirely bark-dwelling (corticolous), growing chiefly on bark and more occasionally on wood. Although recorded from many tree genera, the species shows a strong preference for high-pH, nutrient-rich bark, such as that of Ulmus, Fraxinus, and Acer. Kondratyuk and coauthors summarized the habitat more broadly as bark of broad-leaved trees in forested areas and, in drier steppe habitats, plant debris, soil, and small shrubs, only rarely rock. In steppe habitats it was reported growing together with Caloplaca chlorina and Gallowayella coppinsii. Black Sea populations are strongly maritime and grow mainly on twigs of salt marsh shrubs such as Halocnemum strobilaceum and Limonium suffruticosum, as well as on plant debris and loess soil. The species is widespread but tends to favour maritime regions with a temperate climate.

In the Nordic countries the species was recorded mainly from Denmark and southern Sweden, with only single known collections from Norway and Finland; its centre of occurrence is in southern Scandinavia, where it appears to be chiefly inland rather than strongly maritime. The species occurs across large parts of Europe. In the Netherlands, it occurs throughout the country on nutrient-rich bark, particularly on clay soils, and is most common in coastal areas. It grows especially around tree bases and beneath sap runs on trunks, and had previously been recorded there as corticolous forms of Flavoplaca citrina. In northern Germany, the species was reported in 2012 as new to Mecklenburg-Western Pomerania, from bark of Aesculus hippocastanum and Malus domestica as well as from a weathered wooden post. In 2016 it was reported from Slītere National Park in western Latvia, a record that was also the first for the Baltic States.

Beyond Europe, a 2025 survey reported the species from seven localities on Bering Island in the Commander Islands of the Russian Far East, mostly from coastal habitats on various substrates including driftwood, concrete, siliceous rock outcrops, and whale bone. A collection has been reported from southern Chile, where the pale form was found on weathered leather at a maritime site.
