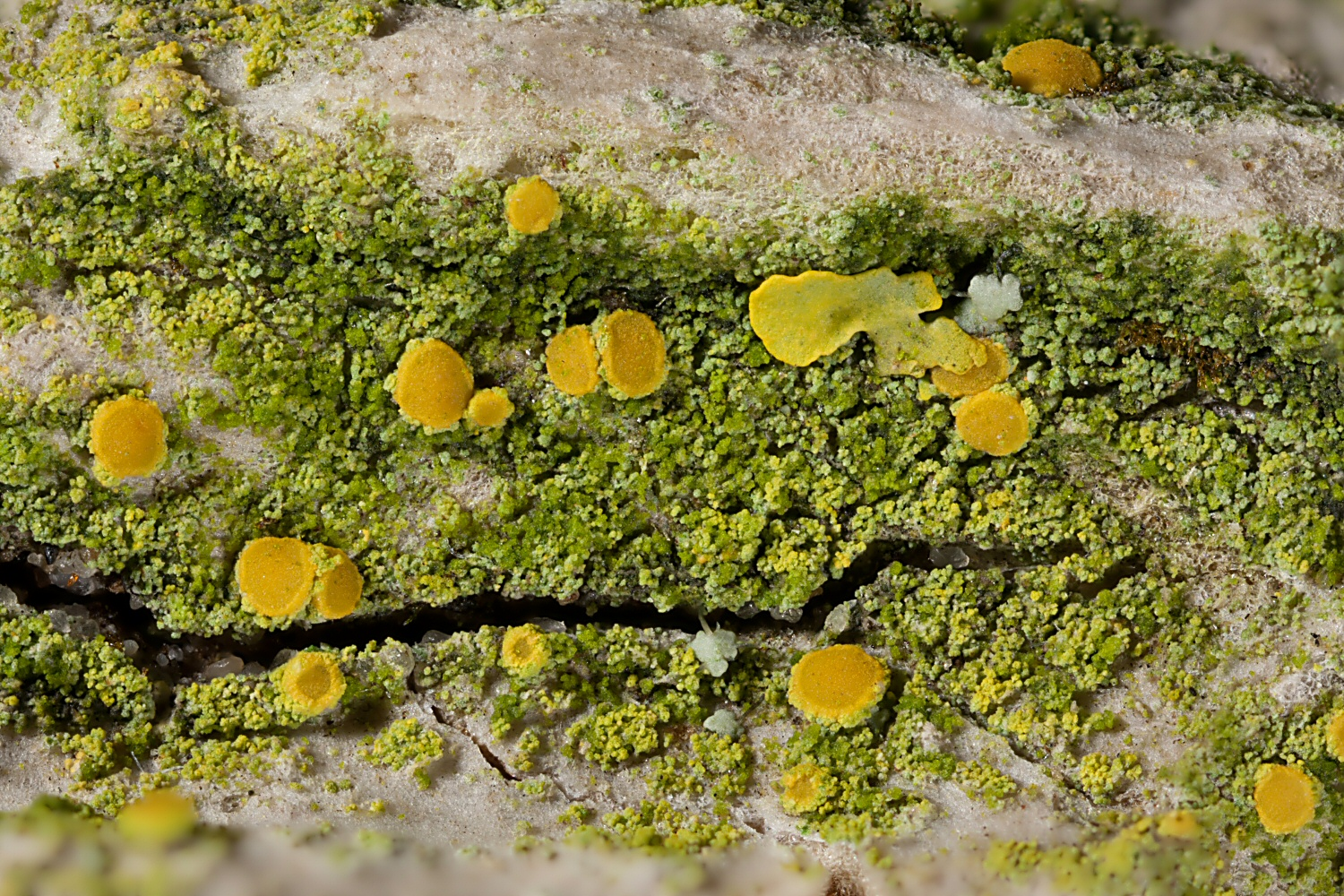
- Scythioria phlogina

Scientific classification
- Domain: Eukaryota
- Kingdom: Fungi
- Division: Ascomycota
- Class: Lecanoromycetes
- Order: Teloschistales
- Family: Teloschistaceae
- Genus: Scythioria; S.Y.Kondr., Kärnefelt, Elix, A.Thell & Hur (2014)

Type species
- Scythioria phlogina (Ach.) S.Y.Kondr., Kärnefelt, Elix, Thell & Hur (2014)

Species
- S. durietzii S. flavogranulosa S. phlogina

= Scythioria =

Genus of lichens

Scythioria is a small genus of lichen-forming fungi in the family Teloschistaceae. It comprises three species. Species in this genus are found primarily in the Palaearctic realm, occurring in Eurasia and North Africa. They typically grow on the bark of broad-leaved trees in forested areas, as well as on plant debris, soil, and small shrubs in steppe and semi-desert environments. They are occasionally found on rock surfaces.

The body (thallus) of species in this genus forms a crust-like (crustose) growth that either appears as small islands (areolate) or becomes embedded within tree bark or rock surfaces. The colour ranges from greenish-white to bright yellow. Scythioria species typically produce abundant powdery reproductive structures called soredia, and have a thin outer layer (cortex) made up of rounded cells that is often not well-developed.

== Taxonomy ==
Genus Scythioria was circumscribed in 2014 by Sergey Kondratyuk and colleagues. It is placed in the family Teloschistaceae. The genus name references the ancient Scythian people who inhabited the steppes of southeastern Europe and Central Asia from the 7th century BC to the 4th century AD, while also alluding to the species epithet of Caloplaca scythica, now considered a synonym of the type species S. phlogina.

Prior to the establishment of Scythioria as a distinct genus, Ulf Arup and colleagues (2013) identified the type species S. phlogina as occupying a separate phylogenetic clade within the broadly defined genus Polycauliona. This recognition led Kondratyuk et al. to formally segregate these species into the new genus Scythioria.

Initially considered monotypic, two additional species were later transferred to Scythioria based on molecular data: S. duritzii and S. flavogranulosa. Although initially proposed for placement in the Teloschistaceae, the genus is still classified in this family by most authors, while Species Fungorum classifies it as of uncertain placement (incertae sedis) in the Lecanoromycetes.

Scythioria is morphologically similar to Leproplaca in the subfamily Caloplacoideae due to its sorediate nature. However, its apothecial anatomy more closely resembles that of Flavoplaca, from which it was segregated based on molecular phylogenetic evidence. Despite their phylogenetic relationship, the three species included in Scythioria show considerable morphological diversity, making it difficult to distinguish this genus from Polycauliona without molecular data.

== Description ==
The genus is characterized by a crust-like body (thallus) that may form small islands on the surface (areolate), grow within bark (endophloeic), or within rock (endolithic). It typically produces abundant powdery reproductive structures (soredia), which initially appear as small dots (punctiform) but may merge into a continuous mass with varied colouration. The outer layer (cortex), when present, is composed of puzzle-like cells (paraplectenchymatous). The apothecia (fruiting bodies) have both fungal and algal tissue in their rim, with the inner part (true exciple) formed by parallel fungal hyphae. These apothecia initially develop with an outer rim containing algal cells that may have soredia, but this rim disappears as the apothecia mature. The rim structure consists of interwoven fungal hyphae.

In terms of chemistry, Scythioria species may contain anthraquinones, which produce a variable potassium hydroxide reaction (K± purple) when spot tested.

== Habitat and distribution ==
Scythioria species are primarily distributed throughout the Palaearctic realm, with occurrences documented across Eurasia and North Africa. The genus has a diverse range of habitat preferences, adapting to various ecological niches. In forested regions, Scythioria lichens are commonly found growing on the bark of broad-leaved trees. This corticolous habit is particularly characteristic of the type species, S. phlogina, in its woodland habitats.

The genus also has a presence in more arid environments. In steppe and semi-desert ecosystems, Scythioria species grow on a variety of substrates including plant debris, soil, and small shrubs. This adaptability to drier conditions is exemplified by specimens previously identified as Caloplaca scythica (now considered synonymous with S. phlogina), which were collected from steppe zones. While less common, Scythioria lichens occasionally colonise rock surfaces. Scythioria species are often found in association with other lichen taxa. They have been documented growing alongside Caloplaca chlorina and Gallowayella coppinsii.

== Species ==
- Scythioria durietzii (H.Magn.) S.Y.Kondr. (2015)
- Scythioria flavogranulosa (Arup) S.Y.Kondr. (2015)
- Scythioria phlogina (Ach.) S.Y.Kondr., Kärnefelt, Elix, A.Thell & Hur (2014)
