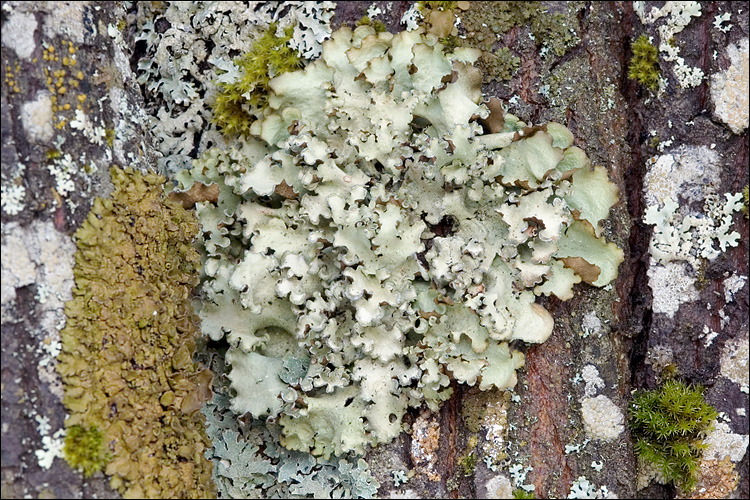
- Cetrelia cetrarioides is the most prominent of several lichens growing on the trunk of this willow tree in the Eastern Julian Alps, Slovenia

Scientific classification
- Kingdom: Fungi
- Division: Ascomycota
- Class: Lecanoromycetes
- Order: Lecanorales
- Family: Parmeliaceae
- Genus: Cetrelia; W.L.Culb. & C.F.Culb. (1968)

Type species
- Cetrelia cetrarioides (Delise) W.L.Culb. & C.F.Culb. (1968)

= Cetrelia =

Genus of lichen-forming fungi

Cetrelia is a genus of leafy lichens in the large family Parmeliaceae. They are commonly known as sea-storm lichens, alluding to the wavy appearance of their lobes. The name of the genus, circumscribed in 1968 by the husband and wife lichenologists William and Chicita Culberson, alludes to the former placement of these species in the genera Cetraria and Parmelia.

The main characteristics of the genus are the broad, rounded lobes of the greyish-green lichen body, and the presence of tiny pores in the outer surface (the cortex) that enable gas exchange. The lower surface of the lichen is brown to black with few root-like rhizines to act as holdfasts, resulting in a fairly loose attachment to the surface the lichen is on. Sexual reproductive structures are usually not present, so the physical characteristics used to distinguish between Cetrelia species include the presence or absence of asexual reproductive structures such as isidia, soredia, and lobules. Cetrelia lichens are chemically diverse and produce several secondary chemicals: atranorin is the main compound produced in the cortex, while substances known as depsides or depsidones are compounds in the medulla (the tissue layer under the cortex) that can be used to help distinguish between species.

The number of species in Cetrelia depends on how the chemical variation in the genus is categorized: there are five distinct forms (morphotypes), and additional morphologically identical but chemically unique species (chemotypes). Although 19 Cetrelia species have been formally described, some authorities prefer to consider the morphologically similar taxa as chemotypes of the same species. Molecular phylogenetic analyses suggest that the chemical races are best treated as distinct species. Known predominantly from the Northern Hemisphere, most Cetrelia species are found in eastern or southern Asia. They prefer somewhat moist, cool habitats, and are most commonly found on tree trunks, but sometimes on rocks or on bryophytes over shaded boulders. The type species, Cetrelia cetrarioides, is widely distributed, having been recorded in Asia, Europe, and North America. Most Cetrelia species that occur in Europe are considered rare or threatened, and appear on the Regional Red Lists of several countries. In Asia, some Cetrelia lichens are used in the preparation of natural dyes, for the production of material with antibiotic-like properties used in traditional medicine, or in the preparation of litmus reagent.

== Systematics ==
=== Taxonomic history ===
The generic name Cetrelia combines Parmelia and Cetraria, the two genera in which most of the species were originally classified. The genus was circumscribed by lichenologists William and Chicita Culberson in 1968. In 1960 they started a study of the genus Cetraria in the broad sense, as it had been defined by Alexander Zahlbruckner in his 1930 work Catalogus Lichenum Universalis. The genus had become a wastebasket taxon, a repository for all parmeliaceous lichens with apothecia on the margins. The Culbersons started by studying the broad-lobed species that had traditionally been placed in Cetraria, a group they called the "parmelioid" Cetrariae. This group included Cetraria sanguinea, C. japonica, and C. collata, as well as a group referred to as the Cetraria glauca group, including C. norvegica and C. chrysantha. This latter group of species had been previously identified by Norwegian botanist Eilif Dahl, who had suggested that Cetraria was polyphyletic in a 1952 study. The Culbersons noticed that Cetraria sanguinea and C. japonica were very similar in morphology to two Parmelia species, Parmelia cetrarioides and P. olivetorum. As a result of their investigations, they transferred three species to the new genus Asahinea, created genus Platismatia for 10 members of the Cetraria glauca group, and Cetrelia for 14 members of the Parmelia cetrarioides group. According to a 2012 review of the family Parmeliaceae, the creation of these three new more natural genera by the Culbersons initiated "a trend of splitting that continued for more than three decades".

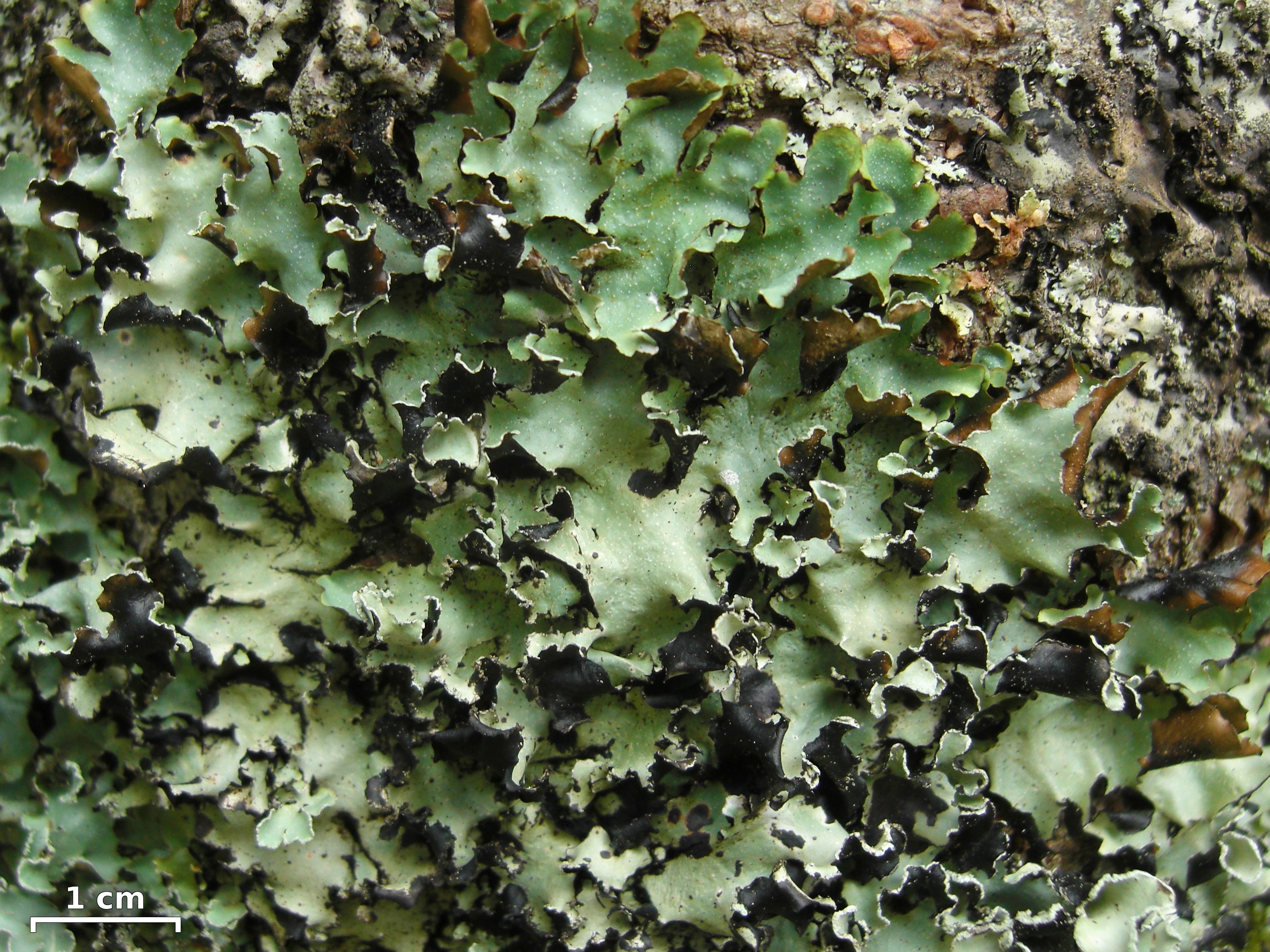
Cetrelia olivetorum; scale bar is 1 cm

In the early 1970s Josef Poelt developed the concept of "species-pairs"—taxa that are morphologically and chemically similar (if not identical), but differ primarily in their reproductive modes: one taxon reproduces sexually, the other vegetatively. Using Cetrelia as an example to explain his ideas, he suggested that both members of these pairs should be assigned the rank of species. In 1976 the Culbersons introduced the idea of morphological groups, or morphotypes with the genus Cetrelia. They named these groups with the Latin epithets of the most prominent species of that group, thus: cetrariodes (thallus with soredia), isidiata (thallus with isidia), sinensis (thallus with marginal dorsiventral lobules), collata (thallus without soredia, isidia, or lobules, often without apothecia and large pseudocyphellae), and davidiana (thallus without vegetative propagules and frequently with apothecia, but pseudocyphellae small). Similarly, the genus contains a number of chemotypes related to the content of the major substances in the medulla. Species with the same chemotype always have the same one or two major constituents, while the complex of minor substances may vary somewhat. Six chemotypes have been recognized in Cetrelia. In a 2019 phylogenetic analysis, these chemotypes were named according to their major medullary substance(s): imbricaric, olivetoric, anziaic, perlatolic, microphyllinic, and alectoronic + α-collatolic. A 2025 revision of Italian material using thin-layer chromatography (TLC) and multilocus phylogenetic analyses recovered four well-supported clades corresponding to the sorediate chemotypes C. cetrarioides, C. chicitae, C. monachorum and C. olivetorum, reinforcing the treatment of these chemotypes as distinct species.

An example of changing taxonomic affinities is given by the four European species of Cetrelia (C. cetrarioides, C. chicitae, C. monachorum, and C. olivetorum). Several studies have suggested accepting only one species in the group with four chemotypes, separated according to the major medullary substances, which can be detected by standard TLC methods, while others have considered the different chemotypes as separate species.

Cetrelia species are commonly known as sea-storm lichens; according to author Colin Rees, "the greenish-gray uplifted edges of its lobes are reminiscent of foam on ocean waves".

=== Phylogeny ===
Prior to the advent of molecular phylogenetics, Cetrelia was grouped together as part of the morphological group "cetrarioid lichens" – species with erect, foliose thalli with marginal apothecia and pycnidia. However, DNA evidence from several studies showed that the cetrarioid lichens were not a monophyletic group of species, and that Cetrelia clustered together outside the cetrarioid lichens, in a group called the "parmelioid Cetrariae", along with the genera Asahinea and Platismatia. Morphological characteristics that unite these three genera include the presence of large, broad, rounded lobes, and thalli that are usually oriented horizontally. Similar to several other groups of parmelioid taxa, Cetrelia lichens have the polysaccharide isolichenan in their cell wall, which is absent in the cetrarioid group. In a later analysis (2010), Cetrelia is resolved as the only member of the Cetrelia clade, one of nine major groups within the parmelioid clade of Parmeliaceae that share similar morphological and chemical characteristics.

A 2019 study investigating the usefulness of secondary metabolites in molecular taxonomy of Cetrelia demonstrated a clear correlation between lichen chemistry and phylogeny, suggesting that it is useful to include information from secondary metabolites when identifying taxa. Cetrelia produces a constant set of polyphenolic compounds of still unknown function, specifically orcinol-type depsides and depsidones. Character state analyses showed that metabolites in Cetrelia seem to be evolving towards more complex substances, indicating possibly their evolutionary importance in the survival or functioning of the species. This research corroborated prior DNA-based evidence that also supported the use of chemotaxonomy to delineate species in Cetrelia.

== Description ==
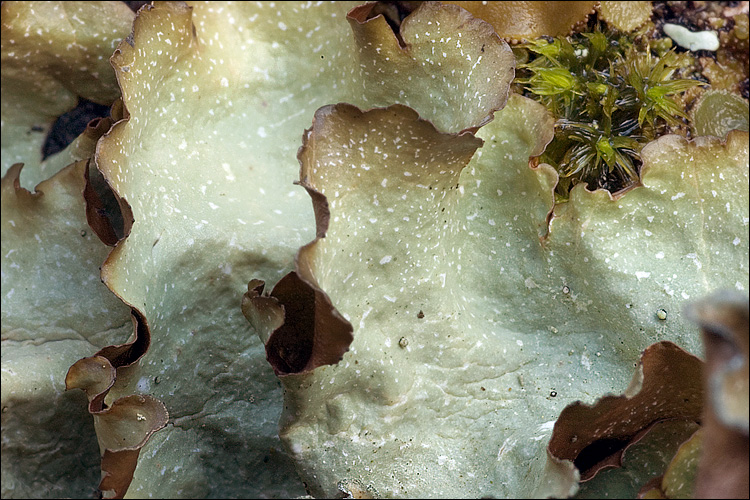
Closeup of the lobes of Cetrelia cetrarioides. White spots and lines are pseudocyphellae.

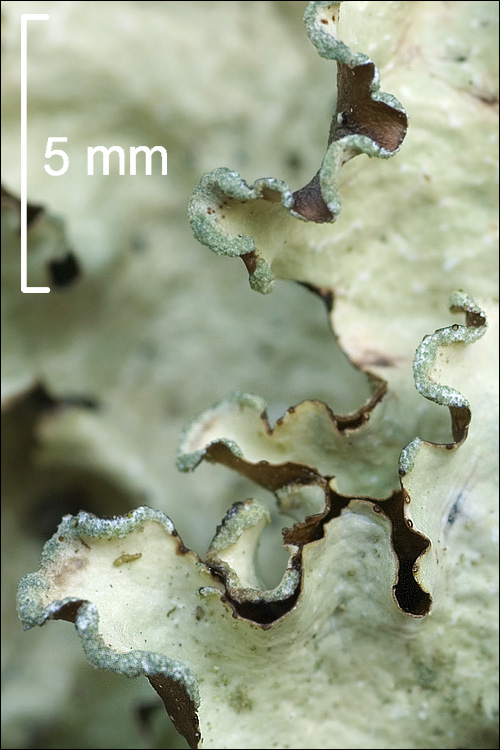
Closeup shows continual marginal soralia on the lobe margin of Cetrelia cetrarioides

Cetrelia is characterized by its foliose (leafy), greyish-green thallus that is loosely attached to the substrate. The thallus has laminal pseudocyphellae – these are small pores in the cortex through which the medulla is directly visible. It has a prosoplectenchymatous upper cortex, meaning that it is made of densely agglutinated hyphae that are not swollen and have tiny lumina. The lower cortex is black, at least in parts, with sparse rhizines, and pycnidia (asexual fruiting bodies) on the margin. The ascospores made by Cetrelia lichens are colourless with an ellipsoid shape, numbering eight per ascus. Their length ranges from 11 to 22 μm, with a width of 6–12 μm. Conidia (asexual spores that are produced in the pycnidia) are rod-shaped and measure 3–6 μm long.

Atranorin is the main secondary chemical in the cortex, and is present in all species. Cetrelia makes several orcinol-type depsidones in the medulla that can be used as diagnostic substances to help identify specimens to species level. Other secondary chemicals that have been identified in this genus are: alectoronic, anziaic, collatolic, imbricaric, microphyllinic, olivetoric, perlatolic, and physodic acids.

In a study of the carotenoids present in six Cetrelia species found in Eurasia, only violaxanthin was found to be present in all samples of all species collected in a range of environments. Of the twenty different carotenoids identified in this study, most are common, although a few are rare in lichens. For example, flavoxanthin, detected in the thalli of C. japonica, had previously only been found in three other instances, although it is not uncommon in the blossom and fruit of higher plants. The presence of a single carotenoid common to all species suggests that in these species, carotenoid biosynthesis is to a large extent dependent upon the conditions of the environment.

The presence or absence of reproductive propagules such as isidia, soredia, and lobules are important physical characters in the taxonomy of Cetrelia. Isidia are rare in the genus, being associated only with C. braunsiana and C. isidiata. Soredia are common; with the exception of C. alaskana, all species are sorediate. The soredia are fine and powdery, and produced on the edge of lobes as continual marginal soralia, which often need magnification to be seen. Lobulae are tiny lobes on the upper surface and margins of the thallus. They are found in C. japonica, C. sinensis, and C. pseudolivetorum.

Morphological characters or chemical characters alone are not enough to distinguish between species in Cetrelia and they should be considered together. For example, C. pseudolivetorum and C. japonica are difficult to distinguish with only a brief physical examination, and are often incorrectly labeled in collections in locations where both species occur. However, they can be identified by checking the colour reaction of C (sodium hypochlorite): a positive reaction (C+), indicates the presence of olivetoric acid, which only occurs in C. pseudolivetorum. In contrast, C. chicitae and C. braunsiana produce the same secondary compounds, and so cannot be distinguished by spot tests or TLC. However, they are readily distinguishable through examination: C. chicitae has soredia on its margin, while C. braunsiana has isidia.

Cetrelia lichens resemble somewhat those in genus Parmotrema, but species of the latter never have pseudocyphellae and usually have cilia on the margin. Platismatia is another morphologically similar genus, but it differs from Cetrelia in always lacking caperatic acid. Cetreliopsis is a genus segregated from Cetreliopsis in 1980. Although superficially similar, Cetreliopsis lichens have a distinct secondary chemistry: they contain usnic acid in the upper cortex, and orcinol depsidones in the medulla.

== Species ==
Altogether, 19 species have been included in Cetrelia, either described as new species, or transferred from other genera. Morphotypes are distinguished primarily by the vegetative propagules: presence or absence of soredia, isidia and lobulae. Although there are only five distinct morphologies (morphotypes) in Cetrelia, 18 species are generally recognized based on differences in secondary compounds (chemotypes), in combination with morphology. Based on the distribution of the majority of the chemotype and morphotype combinations, the centre of speciation in Cetrelia is thought to be southern and eastern Asia.

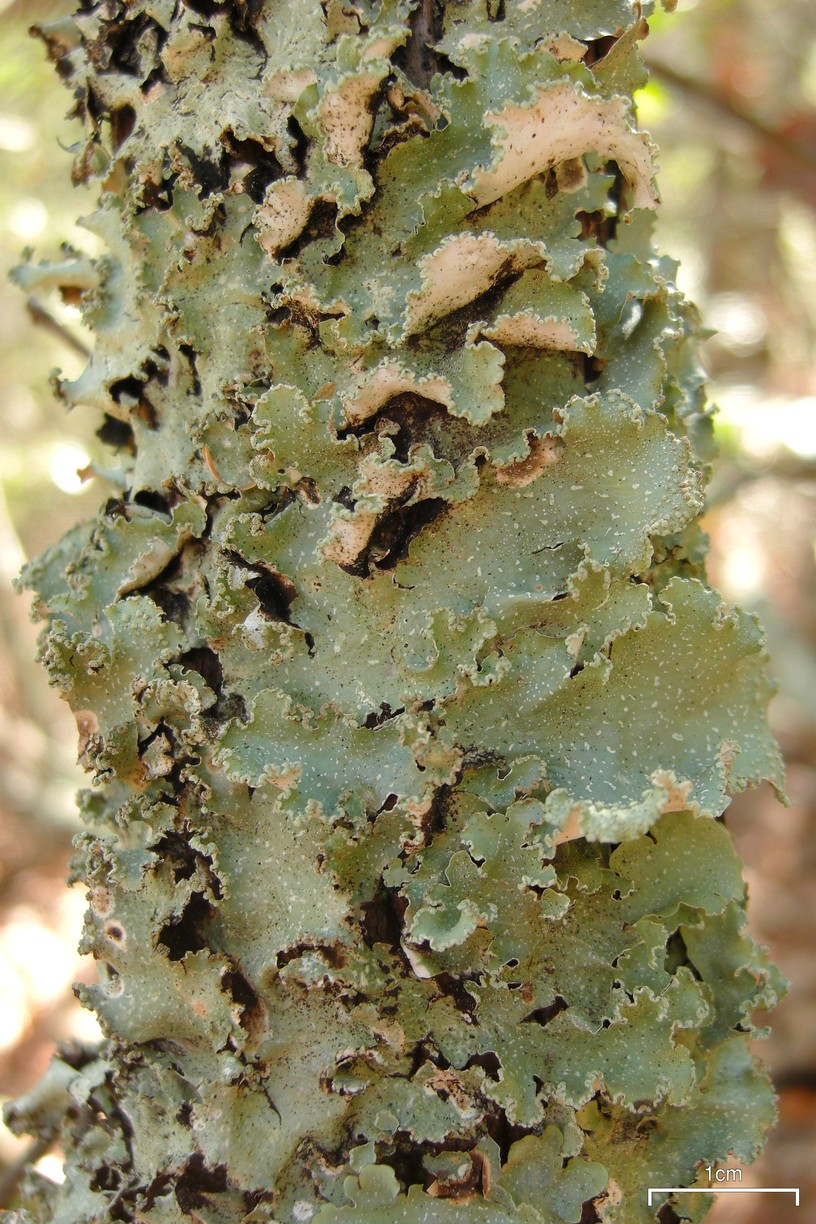
Cetrelia chicitae; scale bar is 1 cm

- Cetrelia alaskana (W.L.Culb. & C.F.Culb.) W.L.Culb. & C.F.Culb. (1968) – Alaska
- Cetrelia braunsiana (Müll.Arg.) W.L.Culb. & C.F.Culb. (1968) – south Asia
- Cetrelia cetrarioides (Delise) W.L.Culb. & C.F.Culb. (1968) – eastern North America; Asia; western Europe
- Cetrelia chicitae (W.L.Culb.) W.L.Culb. & C.F.Culb. (1968) – North America; south Asia; Europe
- Cetrelia collata (Nyl.) W.L.Culb. & C.F.Culb. (1968) – China; Nepal
- Cetrelia davidiana W.L.Culb. & C.F.Culb. (1968) – China
- Cetrelia delavayana W.L.Culb. & C.F.Culb. (1968) – China
- Cetrelia isidiata (Asahina) W.L.Culb. & C.F.Culb. (1968) – Japan
- Cetrelia japonica (Zahlbr.) W.L.Culb. & C.F.Culb. (1968) – Japan; South Korea; Indonesia; Taiwan
- Cetrelia monachorum (Zahlbr.) W.L.Culb. & C.F.Culb. (1977) – Asia; Europe; North America
- Cetrelia nuda (Hue) W.L.Culb. & C.F.Culb. (1968) – Japan; China; Taiwan
- Cetrelia olivetorum (Nyl.) W.L.Culb. & C.F.Culb. (1968) – Asia; Europe; North America
- Cetrelia orientalis Randlane & Saag (1991) – Russia
- Cetrelia pseudocollata Randlane & Saag (1991) – China
- Cetrelia pseudolivetorum (Asahina) W.L.Culb. & C.F.Culb. (1968) – south Asia
- Cetrelia sanguinea (Schaer.) W.L.Culb. & C.F.Culb. (1968) – Asia
- Cetrelia sayanensis Otnyukova, Stepanov & Elix (2009) – Siberia
- Cetrelia sinensis W.L.Culb. & C.F.Culb. (1968) – China; Taiwan

Cetrelia rhytidocarpa (Mont. & Bosch) Lumbsch (1988), transferred from Cetraria to Cetrelia by H. Thorsten Lumbsch in 1988, is now classified as the type species of Cetreliopsis.

As of September 2021, Species Fungorum accepts five species of Cetrelia: C. cetrarioides, C. chicitae, C. monachorum, C. olivetorum, and C. sayanensis.

== Habitat and distribution ==
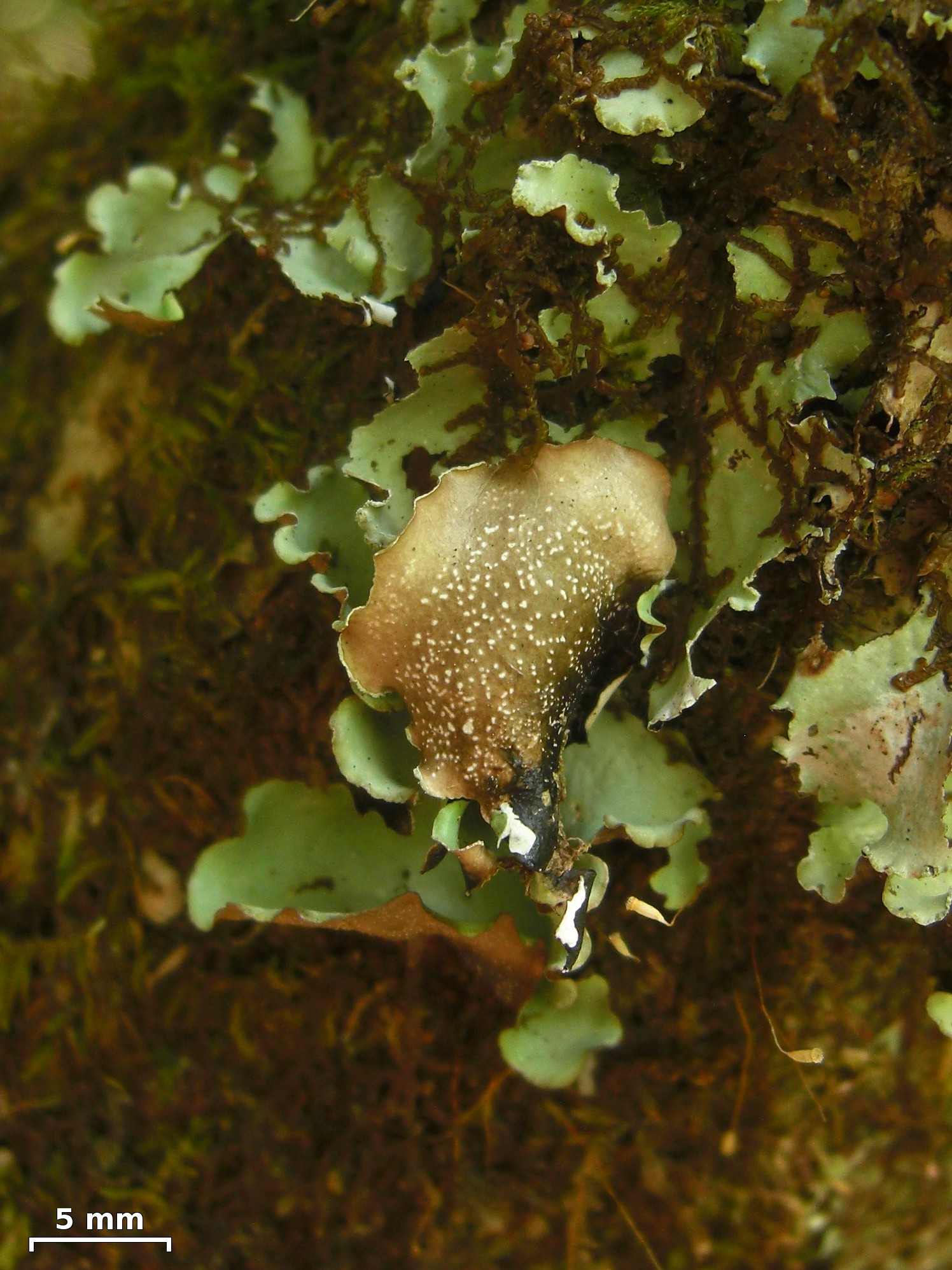
Cetrelia monachorum; scale bar is 0.5 cm

Cetrelia lichens usually grow on bark, but sometimes they are found on rocks and bryophytes. They have been found at a wide altitudinal range, from 1,000 to 4,500 m (3,300 to 14,800 ft). In general, the genus prefers somewhat moist, cool habitats, and is often found on tree trunks or bryophytes over shaded boulders. Cetrelia species found in Europe are largely epiphytic (growing on plants), usually encountered in old natural or seminatural forests on tree bark, and sometimes on mossy rocks. They are usually in areas of high humidity, such as swamp forests, or forests that are surrounded by a lake or river or on hillsides near lakes or streams. The observation that Cetrelia lichens are commonly found among bryophytes or on bark-growing bryophytes suggests that this association provides better moisture conditions for the lichens. Cetrelia usually prefers deciduous trees, although on rare occasions it is recorded growing on conifers. A study of several hundred collections of the genus from locations largely in the eastern European Alps revealed the trees most preferred as substrates: sycamore (34%), European beech (14%), alder (mostly grey alder, 13%), oak sp. (8%), willow sp. (6%), and European ash (6%). The substrate selectivity of Cetrelia is not always consistent through broad geographical regions such as Europe, because the range of the substrate determines whether it will be present in a certain area.

Most Cetrelia species are found in eastern or southeastern Asia. None are found in Africa, Australia, New Zealand, or South America. Four species have been recorded from Europe: Cetrelia cetrarioides, C. chicitae, C. monachorum, and C. olivetorum. In a 2021 study of Cetrelia species in Hungary, the use of chemical analysis to determine the lichen secondary metabolites revealed that all four of those species are found in that country, double the number previously thought to be part of the Hungarian lichen flora. Ten species are found in India, nine species from northeast China, and four from South Korea. Five species are known from North America, while eight species have been recorded in the expansive geographic area formerly known as the Soviet Union. Of the five morphotypes, only cetrarioides is widely distributed in the world. A revision of 320 Italian specimens from 58 sites, using TLC and DNA data, confirmed the presence of all four sorediate European species in Italy. Cetrelia monachorum proved to be the most widespread, occurring from the Alps through the northern Apennines and reaching Sardinia, whereas C. cetrarioides was confined to the Alps. Cetrelia olivetorum and C. chicitae were both rare and had scattered occurrences in moist montane forests of the central-eastern Alps and northern Apennines. Cetrelia cetrarioides is found throughout the Northern Hemisphere, with a few records from the Southern Hemisphere.

== Conservation ==
Some of the Cetrelia species found in Europe are on various Regional Red Lists. Because the four sorediate European species are morphologically very similar and often difficult to distinguish without chemical data, they have been treated as a model group for cryptic macrolichens, and a recent Italian revision showed that past misidentification and data deficiency can hinder reliable assessment of their distribution and threat status. In the Baltic countries, the Cetrelia species are rare and threatened. In Estonia, C. olivetorum and C. cetrarioides are considered as endangered and C. monachorum as critically endangered. Factors threatening these lichens include forest cutting and overgrowing of dunes and alvars due to the cessation of traditional forest management practices. Cetrelia olivetorum has been included in the Legislative List of Legally Protected Lichens of Latvia, a status that allows for the establishment of small nature reserves (up to 30 hectares (74 acres)) to aid in its conservation. In Lithuania, all species of Cetrelia are considered as endangered. They also appear on the Red Lists of Fennoscandian countries; for example, in Sweden, C. olivetorum sensu lato is treated as critically endangered, and in Finland, C. cetrarioides and C. olivetorum as Endangered. In Belarus, C. olivetorum and C. monachorum are listed as Endangered, and C. cetrarioides as critically endangered. The Italian revision further recommended that all sites supporting Cetrelia populations, especially those where more than one species occurs together, should be treated as priorities for legal protection because they represent old, moist montane forests of high conservation value.

== Uses ==
In India, Cetrelia braunsiana is used as a source of a natural dye to colour different fibres such as silk, tussar silk, and cotton. Depending on the type of method used to extract the lichen dye, it produces a final colour of ivory yellow or light yellowish olive. Atranorin is one dye-producing substance found in this species; alectoronic and α-collatolic acid are additional secondary chemicals that occur in C. braunsiana.

In China, Cetrelia cetrarioides, C. olivetorum, and C. pseudolivetorum are collected in bulk for the preparation of material with antibiotic-like properties used in traditional medicine. These three species are also used as a raw material in the production of litmus reagent.
