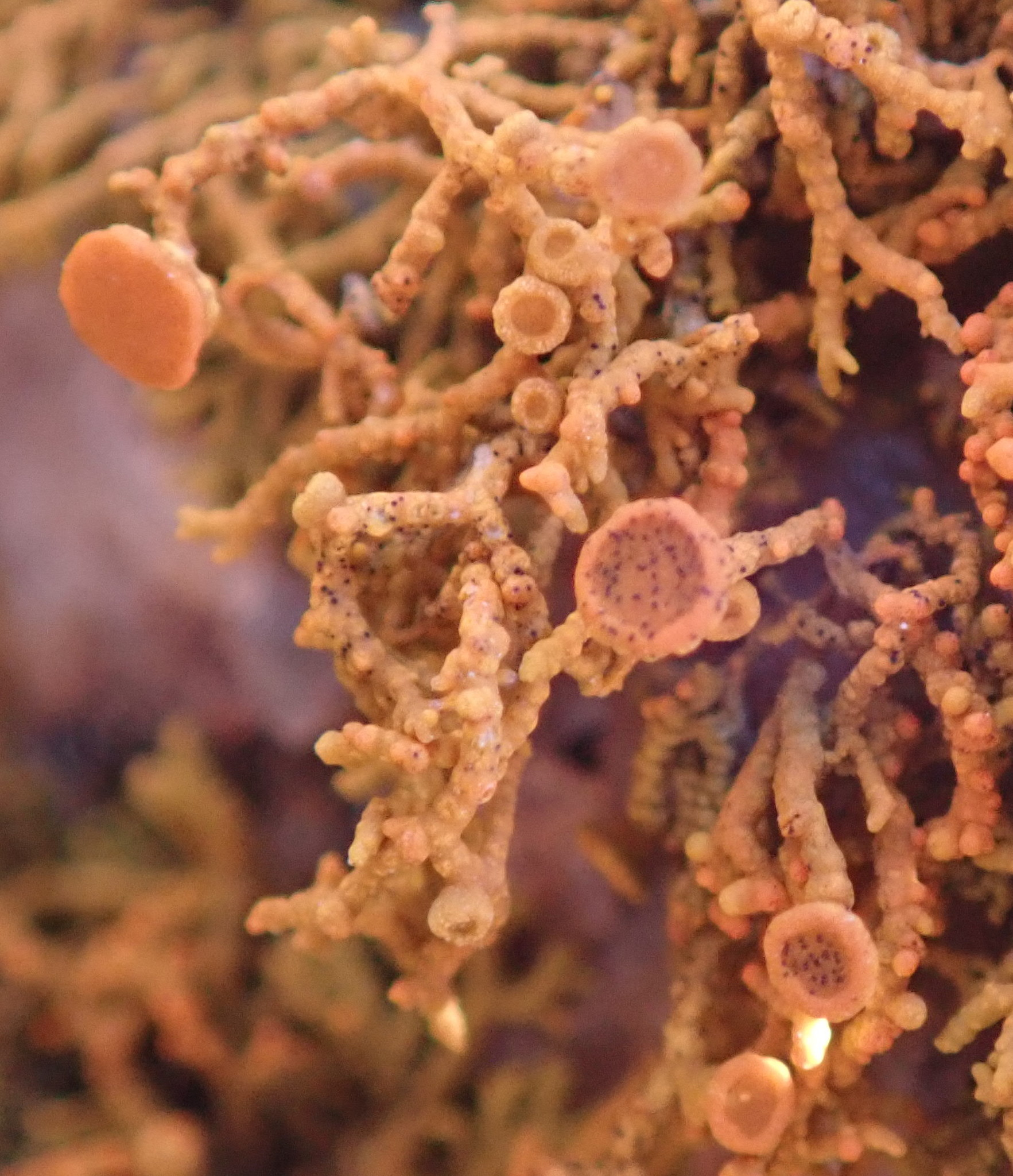

Conservation status
- Apparently Secure (NatureServe)

Scientific classification
- Kingdom: Fungi
- Division: Ascomycota
- Class: Lecanoromycetes
- Order: Teloschistales
- Family: Teloschistaceae
- Genus: Polycauliona
- Species: P. coralloides

Binomial name
- Polycauliona coralloides (Tuck.) Hue (1909)

Synonyms
- Placodium coralloides Tuck. (1866); Lecanora coralloides (Tuck.) Nyl. ex Hue (1891); Caloplaca coralloides (Tuck.) Hulting (1896); Thamnolia coralloides (Tuck.) Gyeln. (1933); Thamnonoma coralloides (Tuck.) Gyeln. (1933)

= Polycauliona coralloides =

Species of lichen

Polycauliona coralloides, the coral firedot lichen, is a species of small fruticose (bushy), saxicolous (rock-dwelling) lichen in the family Teloschistaceae. First formally described in 1866, it was later shuffled to a few different genera in its taxonomic history before ending up in Polycauliona, a genus resurrected from taxonomic obscurity in the molecular phylogenetics era. The lichen occurs on seaside rocks in the intertidal spray zone of California and northwestern Mexico. The species is readily recognized due to its distinctive coral-like form–its thallus grows as a tangle of orange, filamentous branches.

== Taxonomy ==
Polycauliona coralloides, originally described as Placodium coralloides by Edward Tuckerman in 1864, has experienced several taxonomic revisions. It has been reclassified under various genera, including Polycauliona, Thamnoma, and Caloplaca. This species, along with Caloplaca thamnodes, is part of a group of dwarf-fruticose species that formerly belonged to the section Gasparrinia of genus Caloplaca. It had been suspected, even before the advent of molecular phylogenetics, that this group was not monophyletic, implying that these species have evolved separately from different ancestors within the genus. The presence of a microfruticose species in a predominantly crustose genus is unusual, and has led to historical disagreement as to its proper classification. In 2001, Irwin Brodo suggested that the fruticose growth form of the lichen hinted at a possible relationship to Teloschistes, but further pointed out that the North American representatives of this genus were either corticolous or terricolous, and more abundantly branched.

The etymology of the species epithet coralloides alludes to the coral-like appearance of the species. Phylogenetically, Polycauliona coralloides and Caloplaca thamnodes share similarities in thallus anatomy, spore type, overall morphology, and ecology, suggesting a close relationship. However, Caloplaca brattiae may also share a common ancestor with P. coralloides, as indicated by several similar features.

It is commonly known as the "coral firedot lichen".

== Description ==
Polycauliona coralloides is a dwarf-fruticose lichen that forms dense to loose cushions up to 2 cm (13/16 in) in diameter and 8 mm (5/16 in) in height. Its branches are terete, dichotomous (or at least somewhat so) and can be erect, arched, or almost prostrate; they measure about 0.4 mm in diameter and are round and bumpy. The thallus is yellow to orange-yellow and may have pseudocyphellae in small depressions. Initially, P. coralloides forms elongated thallus lobes that adhere closely to the substrate, but over time, it evolves into a distinctly subfruticose thallus. Apothecia are fairly common, zeorine, and can be at the ends of branches or long them. Their disk color is slightly darker than that of the thallus. The spores are polaribilocular and ellipsoid, with a very thin septum.

Chemically, the species is characterized by the presence of parietin as the major pigment, along with small amounts of emodin, teloschistin, parietinic acid, and fallacinal. The thallus and apothecia react K+ (purple), while the medulla shows negative reactions to standard chemical spot tests.

=== Similar species ===
Polycauliona coralloides is often confused with Xanthoria cf. candelaria and Caloplaca thamnodes. X. cf. candelaria differs by having flat lobes with an upper and lower surface and is mostly sorediate, which C. coralloides never is. C. thamnodes, while closely related, can be distinguished by its little branched thallus, slightly thicker branches, darker orange color, and a more southern distribution. The New Zealand endemic Austroplaca erecta has some similarities to P. coralloides. Austroplaca erecta is distinguished by its less prominent pseudocyphellae, differing lobe anatomy, wider ascospores with longer septa, and larger conidia. Caloplaca thamnodes, found in Baja California, is a species similar to Polycauliona coralloides but is distinguishable by its less branched thallus, marginally thicker branches, and a more pronounced dark orange hue.

== Habitat, distribution, and ecology ==
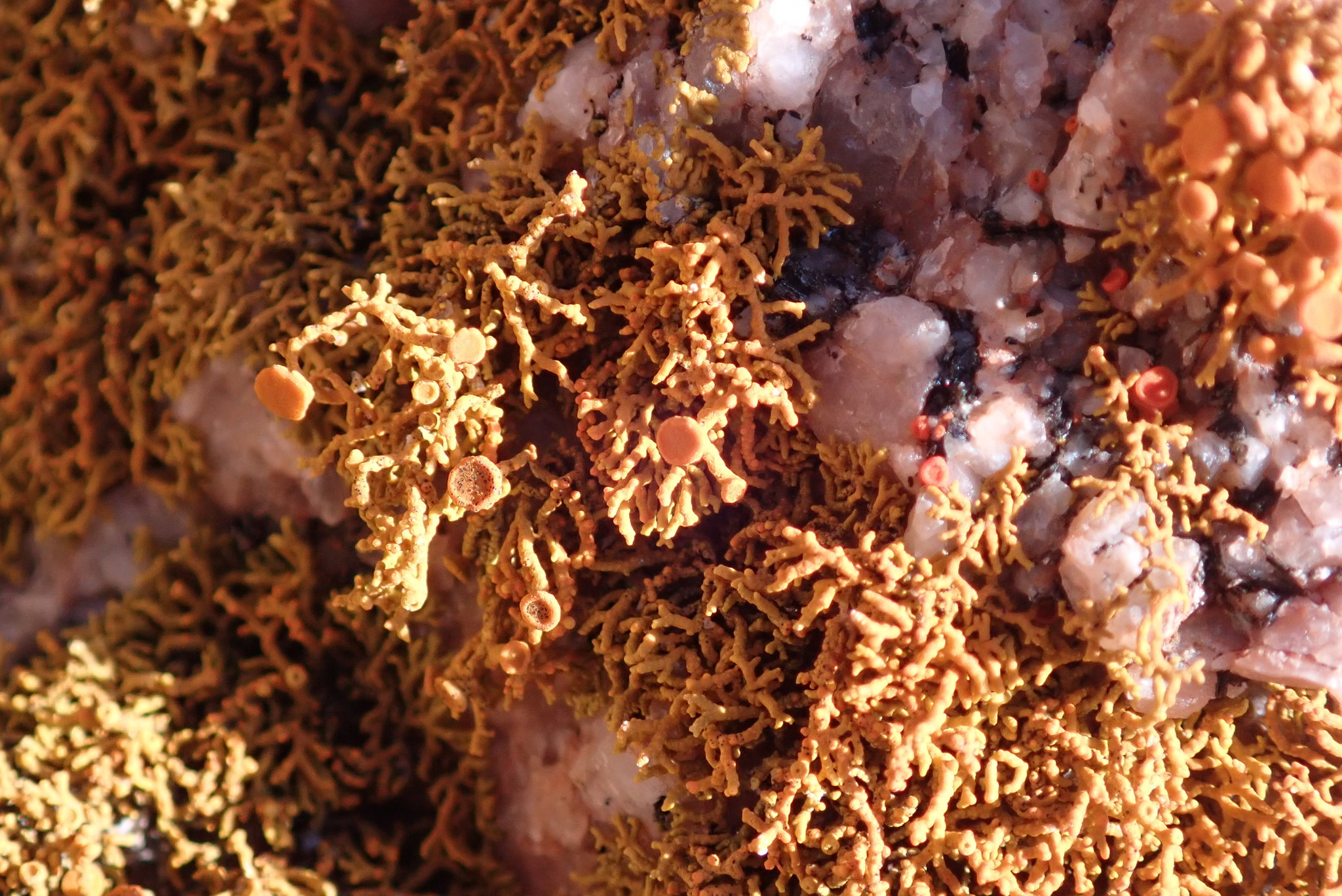
Polycauliona coralloides

Polycauliona coralloides is a strictly littoral species, found close to the seashore, predominantly on hard rocks and mainly on vertical surfaces. It typically grows in the lower part of the supralittoral zone within a narrow vertical range. The species often occupies locations closer to the shore than Caloplaca rosei and Caloplaca brattiae and avoids sites exposed to bird manuring. As might be expected for a littoral species, it is quite tolerant to sea salt.

The distribution of P. coralloides extends from northern Baja California, Mexico, to northern Oregon. Its presence further south is possible, but not likely further north due to unsuitable habitats in these regions. It has also been documented in Channel Islands National Park.

Stigmidium hesperium is a lichenicolous fungus, first described in 2009, that parasitises Polycauliona coralloides. Infection by the fungus results in erosion and bleaching of the thallus and apothecia.
