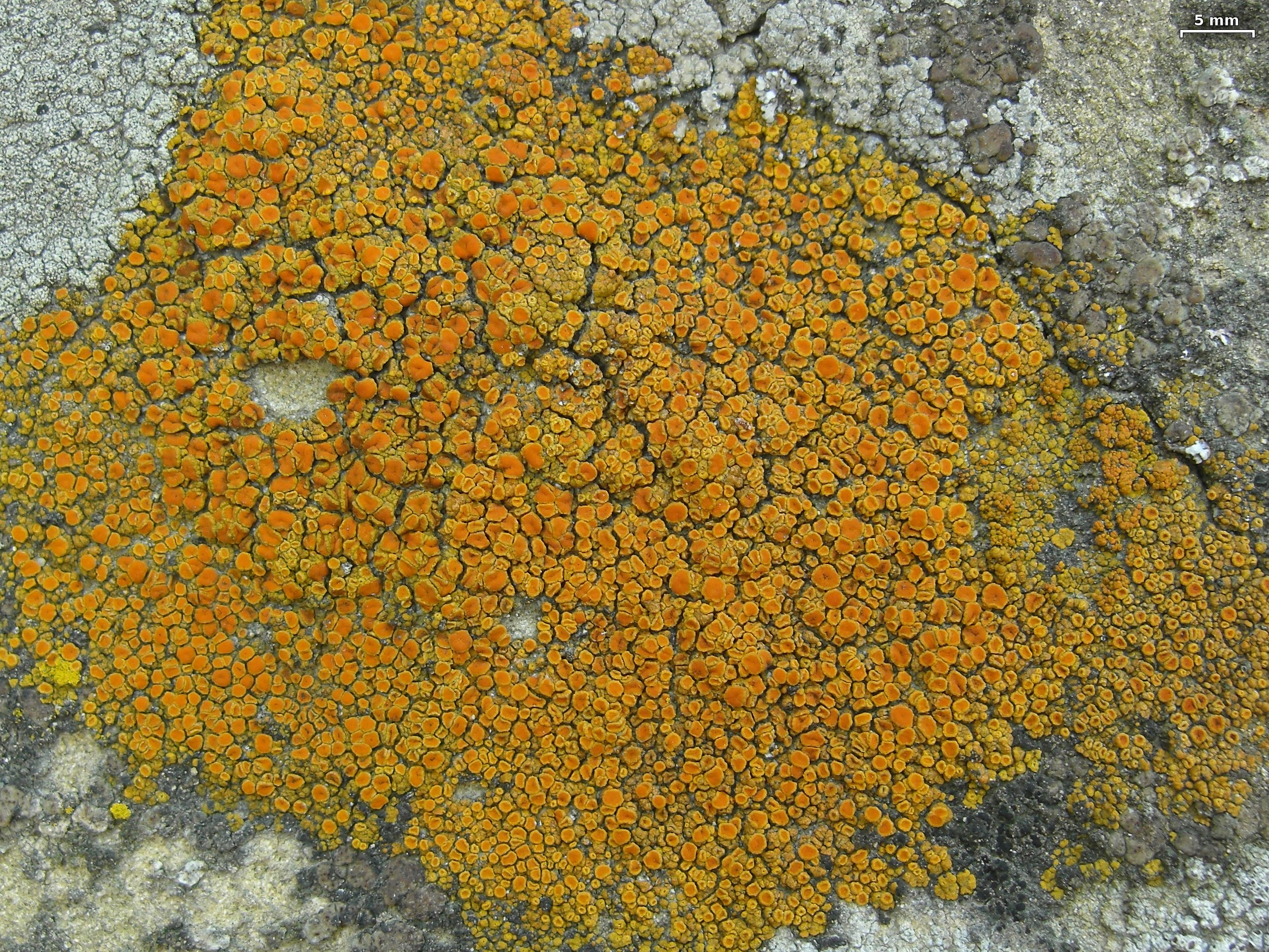
- in the Santa Monica Mountains, southern California

Conservation status
- Apparently Secure (NatureServe)

Scientific classification
- Domain: Eukaryota
- Kingdom: Fungi
- Division: Ascomycota
- Class: Lecanoromycetes
- Order: Teloschistales
- Family: Teloschistaceae
- Genus: Polycauliona
- Species: P. bolacina

Binomial name
- Polycauliona bolacina (Tuck.) Arup, Frödén & Søchting (2013)

Synonyms
- Placodium bolacinum Tuck. (1866); Amphiloma bolacinum (Tuck.) Müll.Arg. (1888); Caloplaca bolacina (Tuck.) Herre (1910); Pyrenodesmia bolacina (Tuck.) E.D.Rudolph (1955)

= Polycauliona bolacina =

Species of lichen

Polycauliona bolacina, the waxy firedot lichen, is a species of saxicolous (rock-dwelling), crustose lichen in the family Teloschistaceae. It is found in western North America.

== Taxonomy ==
The lichen was first formally described as a new species in 1866 by American botanist Edward Tuckerman in 1866, as Placodium bolacinum. Ulf Arup and colleagues transferred the taxon to the genus Polycauliona in 2013, as part of a molecular phylogenetics-based restructuring of family Teloschistaceae. The species is commonly known as the "waxy firedot lichen".

== Description ==
Polycauliona bolacina is characterized by a thallus that has a yellow-orange color, often with a somewhat waxy texture. Its structure is primarily made up of thick squamules or convex areoles, which are either scattered or situated closely together. These components can extend up to 2 mm across and are slightly lobed. The apothecia (fruiting bodies) range from 0.7 to 2 mm in diameter, with orange disks and margins that are slightly paler in comparison. The tissues of the apothecia, including the exciple and cortex, consist of elongated cells arranged in an irregular pattern. Within the medulla, there are few crystals present. The ascospores of Polycauliona bolacina measure between 12.5 and 17.5 μm in length and 5.5 to 8.5 μm in width, with a septum that is 3 to 5.2 μm thick.

== Species interactions ==
Sclerococcum knudsenii is a lichenicolous fungus that has been recorded growing on P. bolacina in California.
