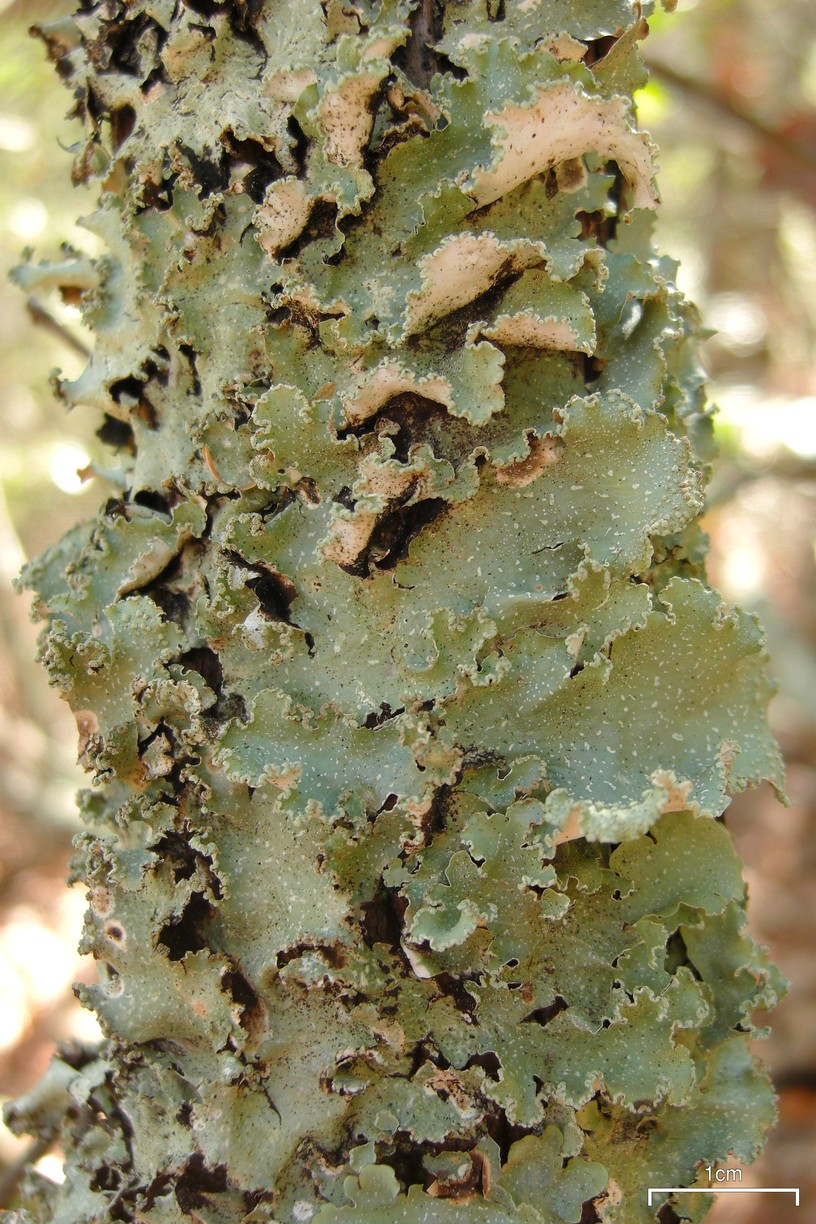
- in the Smoky Mountains of North Carolina, USA; scale bar is 1 cm

Conservation status
- Secure (NatureServe)

Scientific classification
- Kingdom: Fungi
- Division: Ascomycota
- Class: Lecanoromycetes
- Order: Lecanorales
- Family: Parmeliaceae
- Genus: Cetrelia
- Species: C. chicitae

Binomial name
- Cetrelia chicitae (W.L.Culb.) W.L.Culb. & C.F.Culb. (1968)

Synonyms
- Cetraria chicitae W.L.Culb. (1965)

= Cetrelia chicitae =

Species of lichen-forming fungus

Cetrelia chicitae is a species of foliose lichen in the family Parmeliaceae. It is found in eastern Asia, North America, and Europe, where it grows on mossy rocks and tree trunks. First described in 1965 as Cetraria chicitae and transferred to Cetrelia in 1968, it is part of the Cetrelia olivetorum species complex, a group of morphologically similar sorediate lichens. The species is considered critically endangered in Poland, and in Italy it is the rarest of its genus, confined to a few of mountainous old-growth forest sites.

== Taxonomy ==
It was first formally described in 1965 by American lichenologist William L. Culberson as Cetraria chicitae. The type specimen was collected in Gaudineer Knob, a mountain summit in eastern West Virginia. The taxon was transferred to the new genus Cetrelia in 1968. The specific epithet chicitae honours Culberson's wife Chicita Culberson, also a lichenologist.

It is part of the Cetrelia olivetorum species complex, a group of morphologically similar lichens now treated as four distinct species: C. cetrarioides, C. chicitae, C. monachorum, and C. olivetorum in the strict sense (sensu stricto.

== Description ==
Cetrelia chicitae has a foliose (leafy) thallus, greenish-gray to pale brownish-gray in colour, comprising broad, undulating lobes measuring 5–20 mm (0.2–0.8 in) in diameter. The thallus surface features white soredia, powdery to coarsely granular in form, that lie on the lobe margins. Pseudocyphellae are present on the upper thallus surface; they are mostly within 0.15–0.6 mm in diameter. The thallus undersurface is black to brown, sometimes with blotches of ivory colour at the margins. Rhizines are sparse (usually absent at the margins) and black.

Secondary metabolites found in the lichen include atranorin, found in the upper cortex, and alectoronic and α-collatolic acids, present in the medulla. Analyses of Italian material have also detected physodic acid in the medulla, together with alectoronic and α-collatolic acids.

In European material, Cetrelia chicitae can be recognised by the combination of relatively large, usually flat pseudocyphellae that are often developed even in the older, central parts of the thallus, and bands of coarse soredia along the strongly twisted lobe tips, which give the soralia a distinctly crenulate (scalloped), bitten-off appearance. The lower surface is regularly ridged with scattered simple black rhizines and a narrow rhizine-free margin, and Italian collections have so far all been sterile, with no apothecia recorded.

== Habitat and distribution ==
The lichen grows on both mossy boulders and tree trunks. In east Asia it has been found in Korea, Japan, and Sakhalin. Its North American distribution extends from New Brunswick west to southern Ontario and south to Tennessee and North Carolina. It has been recorded from various locales in Europe, although it is relatively uncommon there. In Italy, Cetrelia chicitae is the rarest of the four sorediate Cetrelia species, known from only five sites in the central-eastern Alps. It occurs there between about 870 and 1 200 m in humid montane beech, conifer and mixed beech–conifer forests, usually near streams and in stands that are frequently affected by rain or fog. The Italian populations are confined to well-preserved forests with documented continuity over at least three centuries, and the authors regard these sites as of high conservation value because they support C. chicitae together with other rare macrolichens typical of old, moist montane woodland. Cetrelia chicitae is critically endangered in Poland.
