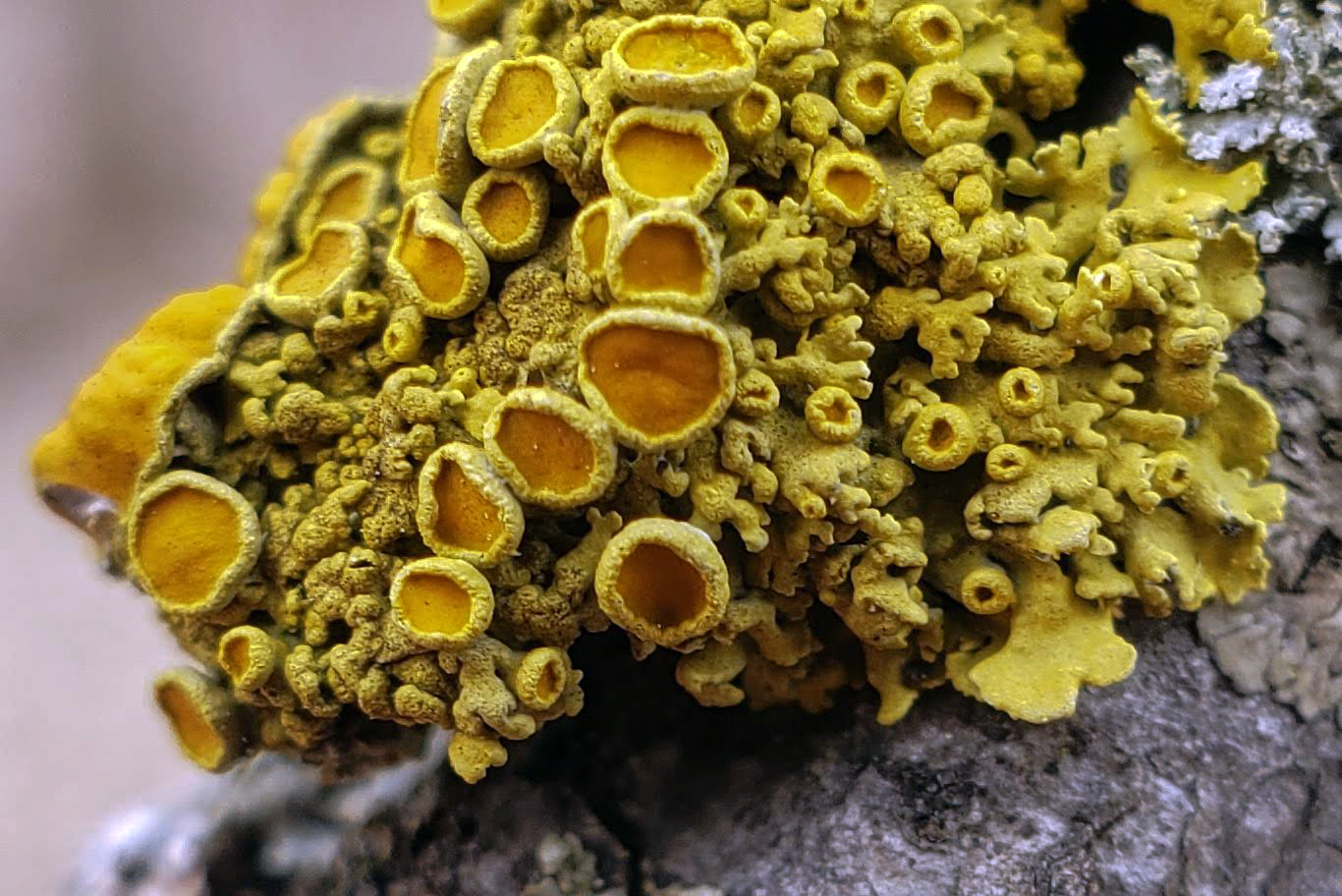

Conservation status
- Secure (NatureServe)

Scientific classification
- Kingdom: Fungi
- Division: Ascomycota
- Class: Lecanoromycetes
- Order: Teloschistales
- Family: Teloschistaceae
- Genus: Polycauliona
- Species: P. polycarpa

Binomial name
- Polycauliona polycarpa (Hoffm.) Frödén, Arup & Søchting (2013)

Synonyms
- List: Lobaria polycarpa Hoffm. (1796); Lichen polycarpus (Hoffm.) Ehrh. (1799); Parmelia candelaria var. polycarpa (Hoffm.) Ach. (1803); Lecanora candelaria var. polycarpa (Hoffm.) Ach. (1810); Placodium polycarpum (Hoffm.) Frege (1812); Parmelia polycarpa (Hoffm.) Spreng. (1820); Psoroma polycarpum (Hoffm.) Gray (1821); Parmelia parietina var. polycarpa (Hoffm.) Fr. (1831); Squamaria candelaria var. polycarpa (Hoffm.) Hook. (1833); Lobaria parietina var. polycarpa (Hoffm.) Fürnr. (1839); Squamaria polycarpa (Hoffm.) Sm. (1844); Parmelia parietina f. polycarpa (Hoffm.) Körb. (1846); Imbricaria parietina f. polycarpa (Hoffm.) Flot. (1850); Physcia parietina var. polycarpa (Hoffm.) A.Massal. (1852); Physcia parietina f. polycarpa (Hoffm.) Körb. (1855); Teloschistes parietinus var. polycarpus (Hoffm.) Tuck. (1866); Physcia polycarpa (Hoffm.) Linds. (1869); Xanthoria lychnea var. polycarpa (Hoffm.) Th.Fr. (1871); Physcia parietina subsp. polycarpa (Hoffm.) Lamy (1880); Xanthoria parietina f. polycarpa (Hoffm.) Arnold (1881); Teloschistes parietinus subsp. polycarpus (Hoffm.) Tuck. (1882); Teloschistes polycarpus (Hoffm.) Tuck. (1882); Xanthoria polycarpa (Hoffm.) Rieber (1891); Xanthoria lychnea f. polycarpa (Hoffm.) Eitner (1901); Xanthoria lychnea subsp. polycarpa (Hoffm.) Hasse (1913); Massjukiella polycarpa (Hoffm.) S.Y.Kondr., Fedorenko, S.Stenroos, Kärnefelt, Elix, Hur & A.Thell (2012)

= Polycauliona polycarpa =

Species of lichen

Polycauliona polycarpa is a species of corticolous (bark-dwelling), foliose lichen in the family Teloschistaceae. It was first formally described by German botanist Georg Franz Hoffmann in 1796, as Lobaria polycarpa. It has acquired quite an extensive synonymy in its taxonomic history. In 2013, Patrik Frödén and colleagues transferred it to the genus Polycauliona, as part of a molecular phylogenetics-based restructuring of the family Teloschistaceae. In northern North America, one vernacular name for the species is pin-cushion sunburst lichen.
