= Polycauliona comandorica =

Scientific classification
- Kingdom: Fungi
- Division: Ascomycota
- Class: Lecanoromycetes
- Order: Teloschistales
- Family: Teloschistaceae
- Genus: Polycauliona
- Species: P. comandorica

Binomial name
- Polycauliona comandorica Himelbrant, Stepanchikova & I.V.Frolov (2021)

Species of lichen-forming fungus

Polycauliona comandorica is a species of fruticulose (minutely shrubby) lichen in the family Teloschistaceae. It was formally described as a new species in 2021 by Dmitry Himelbrant, Irina Stepanchikova, and Ivan Frolov.

The lichen is found in the splash zone of the Commander Islands in the Russian Far East; its specific epithet comandorica refers to its type locality. It is considered to be endemic to the region formerly known as Beringia. The type specimen was collected on Medny Island, under a colony of horned puffins. A close association with seabird colonies is common to all of the known localities of this lichen species. Several secondary compounds have been detected in the lichen, including parietin as a major compound, and minor to trace amounts of parietinic acid, emodin, citreorosein, emodinal, emodic acid, fallacinal, and teloschistin.

The fruticulose growth form is rather rare in the Teloschistaceae, with about a dozen examples known in the family of about one thousand species. P. comandorica is somewhat similar in morphology to P. thamnodes; it is distinguished by its lighter yellow to grey thallus, its rougher, longer and thicker branches; its soredia and blastidia; and in the absence of apothecia.
