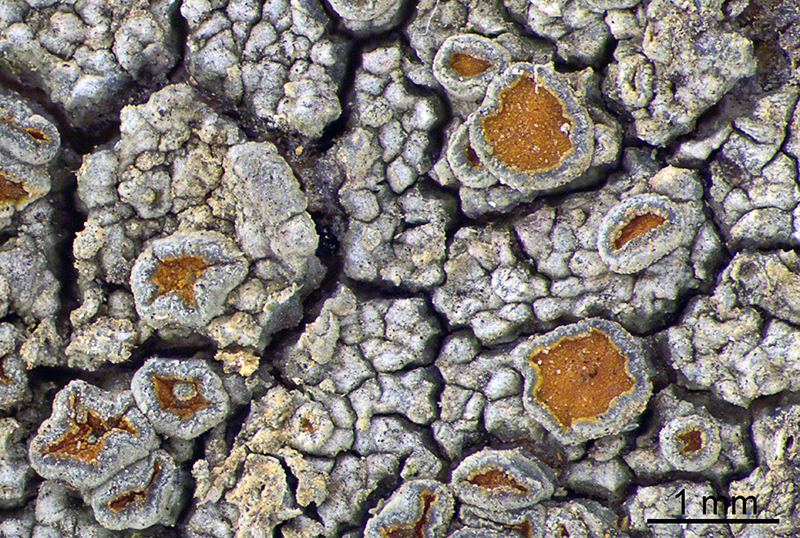

Scientific classification
- Kingdom: Fungi
- Division: Ascomycota
- Class: Lecanoromycetes
- Order: Teloschistales
- Family: Teloschistaceae
- Genus: Caloplaca
- Species: C. chlorina

Binomial name
- Caloplaca chlorina (Flot.) H.Olivier (1909)

Synonyms
- List: Zeora cerina a* chlorina Flot. (1850); Callopisma cerinum f. chlorinum (Flot.) Körb. (1855); Callopisma cerinum var. chlorinum (Flot.) Körb. (1859); Placodium cerinum var. chlorinum (Flot.) Anzi (1860); Caloplaca cerina var. chlorina (Flot.) Müll.Arg. (1862); Caloplaca cerina f. chlorina (Flot.) Müll.Arg. (1862); Lecanora cerina var. chlorina (Flot.) Leight. (1871); Lecanora cerina subsp. chlorina (Flot.) Lamy (1880); Lecanora chlorina (Flot.) Lamy (1880); Caloplaca pyracea var. chlorina (Flot.) Boistel (1903); Lecanora cerina f. chlorina (Flot.) Harm. (1909); Caloplaca cerina subsp. chlorina (Flot.) Sandst. (1912); Caloplaca gilva var. chlorina (Flot.) Mereschk. (1913); Zeora cerina var. chlorina (Flot.) Zahlbr. (1930); Placodium gilvum var. chlorinum (Flot.) Räsänen (1931); Placodium chlorinum (Flot.) Szatala (1960); Lecanora cerina var. cyanopolia Nyl. (1866); Lecanora cerina f. cyanopolia (Nyl.) Leight. (1879); Caloplaca ferruginea f. cyanopolia (Nyl.) Blomb. & Forssell (1880); Lecanora chlorina f. cyanopolia (Nyl.) Cromb. (1894); Caloplaca chlorina var. cyanopolia (Nyl.) H.Olivier (1909); Caloplaca cerina var. cyanopolia (Nyl.) H.Olivier (1909); Caloplaca isidiigera Vězda (1978)

= Caloplaca chlorina =

Species of lichen

Caloplaca chlorina is a species of saxicolous (rock-dwelling) crustose lichen in the family Teloschistaceae. It occurs in Europe, where it grows on damp siliceous rocks. This lichen forms dark grey crusts with a bluish tint that break into irregular blocks covered with powdery granules, giving the surface a flour-like appearance. It was first described in 1850 and rarely produces fruiting bodies, but when present they are small with bright yellow to orange centres surrounded by thick grey rims.

== Taxonomy ==
It was originally described as a new species in 1850 by Julius von Flotow. Henri Jacques François Olivier transferred it to Caloplaca in 1909.

== Description ==
The lichen forms a thin to moderately thick crust that spreads widely over its rock substrate. Its surface is dark grey with a bluish cast and breaks into coarse, irregular polygonal blocks known as areoles. These blocks are dusted with masses of minute powdery propagules—technically called soredia or blastidia—each about 25–50 micrometres (μm) across. Because the soredia originate around the margins of the areoles and then blanket the entire surface, the thallus acquires a granular, flour-like appearance.

Fruiting bodies (apothecia) are uncommon and small, rarely exceeding 1.5 mm in diameter. They lie partly submerged among the granules, bordered by a thick, grey rim derived from the thallus itself. The central disc ranges from bright yellow to dull orange and may become slightly domed with age. Inside each disc, unbranched threads of fungal tissue (paraphyses) end in tips that swell to about 5 μm wide. The asci produce eight colourless ascospores, each 10–15 μm long and 5–7 μm wide, divided by a cross-wall (septum) about one-third of the spore's length. In standard chemical spot tests, the thallus turns a faint violet when treated with potassium hydroxide solution (the K-test), whereas the apothecial disc reacts a deeper purple, helping confirm the identify of the species in the field.

== Habitat and distribution ==
Caloplaca chlorina is a mainly Holarctic species, recorded in Europe from the forest-steppe zone northwards to the southern tundra, and in Siberia it has so far been reported only from the Altai Mountains and Sayan Mountains. On Bering Island, Caloplaca chlorina has been reported from two sites: one in a coastal locality and another on a lakeshore; in both cases it grew on siliceous rocks and boulders. A single report from Brazil has been cited as a possible Southern Hemisphere record, but has been suggested to require confirmation using molecular data.

== See also ==
- List of Caloplaca species
