= Anziaic acid =

Carboxylate ester

Names
- IUPAC name 4-(2,4-Dihydroxy-6-pentylbenzoyl)oxy-2-hydroxy-6-pentylbenzoic acid

Identifiers
CAS Number	641-68-9
3D model (JSmol)	Interactive image
ChEBI	CHEBI:144192
ChEMBL	ChEMBL3134416
ChemSpider	31104179
PubChem CID	12306720
CompTox Dashboard (EPA)	DTXSID901169856
- InChI: InChI=1S/C24H30O7/c1-3-5-7-9-15-11-17(25)13-19(26)22(15)24(30)31-18-12-16(10-8-6-4-2)21(23(28)29)20(27)14-18/h11-14,25-27H,3-10H2,1-2H3,(H,28,29) Key: BEFYPHLCGVCBFF-UHFFFAOYSA-N
- SMILES: CCCCCC1=C(C(=CC(=C1)O)O)C(=O)OC2=CC(=C(C(=C2)O)C(=O)O)CCCCC

Properties
Chemical formula	C_{24}H_{30}O_{7}
Molar mass	430.5 g/mol
Melting point	122 °C (252 °F; 395 K) dec
- Except where otherwise noted, data are given for materials in their standard state (at 25 °C [77 °F], 100 kPa). Infobox references

Anziaic acid is a depside found in lichens. It gives a red reaction in the C test. The two phenolic rings have a pentyl side chain. It is an ester dimer of olivetolic acid.

Anziaic acid works as an antibacterial compound by inhibiting topoisomerase.

== Production ==
Anziaic acid has been artificially produced from olivetolic acid by benzylation of the O-phenol positions, and then condensing with trifluoroacetic anhydride.

== Properties ==
Anziaic acid is colourless. It can be dissolved in ethanol, ethanol-water mixture, or cyclohexane-benzene mixture.

== Related ==
Perlatolic acid, dihydropicrolichenic acid, 2'-O-methylanziaic acid, 2-O-methylperlatolic acid, 2'-O-methylperlatolic and planaic acid are derivatives of anziaic acid, where a methyl group replaces a hydrogen in some of the hydroxy positions on the rings.

== Occurrence ==
Anziaic acid is found in Parmeliaceae including Hypotrachyna, Stereocaulon, and Cetrelia.
