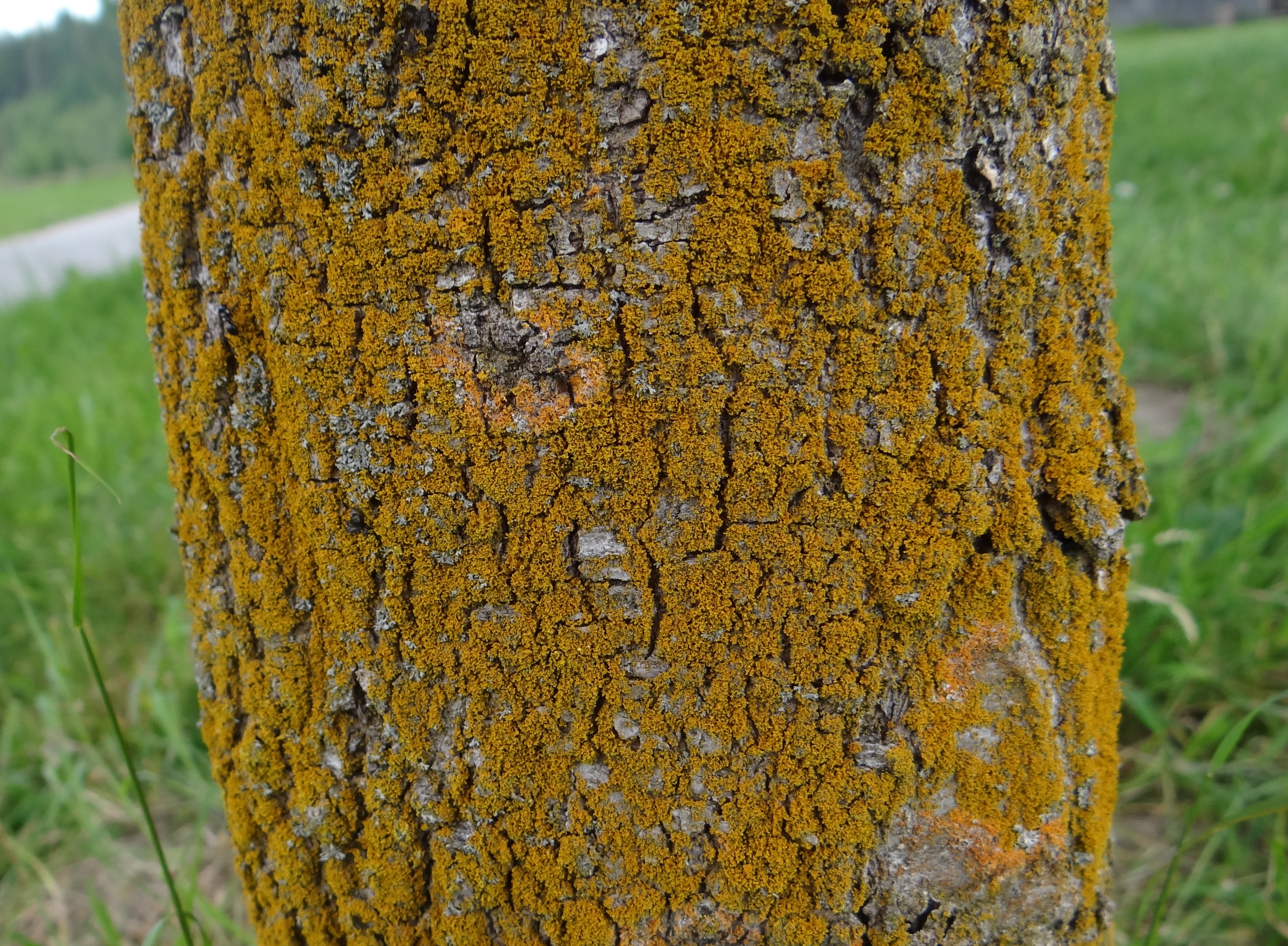

Conservation status
- Secure (NatureServe)

Scientific classification
- Kingdom: Fungi
- Division: Ascomycota
- Class: Lecanoromycetes
- Order: Teloschistales
- Family: Teloschistaceae
- Genus: Polycauliona
- Species: P. candelaria

Binomial name
- Polycauliona candelaria (L.) Frödén, Arup & Søchting (2013)

Synonyms
- Lichen candelarius L. (1753); Xanthoria candelaria (L.) Th.Fr. (1861); Teloschistes candelarius (L.) Fink (1935)

= Polycauliona candelaria =

Species of lichen-forming fungus

Polycauliona candelaria is a species of corticolous (bark-dwelling) lichen in the family Teloschistaceae. It was one of the first lichens formally described by Swedish naturalist Carl Linnaeus in his 1753 work Species Plantarum. Since then, the taxon has acquired a long and extensive synonymy. It was finally transferred to the genus Polycauliona by Ulf Arup and colleagues in 2013, as part of a molecular phylogenetics-based restructuring of the family Teloschistaceae. In North America, one vernacular name is shrubby sunburst lichen.

== See also ==
- List of lichens named by Carl Linnaeus
