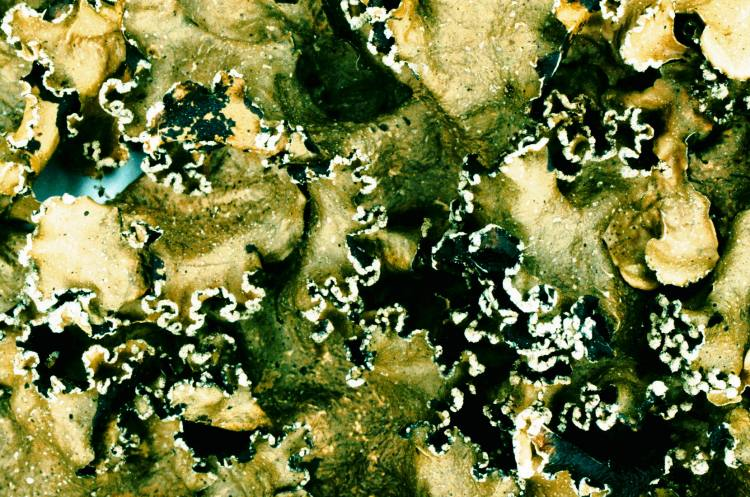

Conservation status
- Apparently Secure (NatureServe)

Scientific classification
- Kingdom: Fungi
- Division: Ascomycota
- Class: Lecanoromycetes
- Order: Lecanorales
- Family: Parmeliaceae
- Genus: Cetrelia
- Species: C. cetrarioides

Binomial name
- Cetrelia cetrarioides (Delise) W.L.Culb. & C.F.Culb.

Synonyms
- Parmelia perlata β cetrarioides Duby (1830)

= Cetrelia cetrarioides =

Species of lichen-forming fungus

Cetrelia cetrarioides is a foliose lichen belonging to the family Parmeliaceae.

It is native to Eurasia and Northern America. In Nepal, Cetrelia cetrarioides has been reported from 2,000 to 3,000 m elevation in a compilation of published records.

It is part of the Cetrelia olivetorum species complex, a group of morphologically similar lichens now treated as four distinct species: C. cetrarioides, C. chicitae, C. monachorum, and C. olivetorum in the strict sense (sensu stricto.
