= Cetreliopsis =

Scientific classification
- Domain: Eukaryota
- Kingdom: Fungi
- Division: Ascomycota
- Class: Lecanoromycetes
- Order: Lecanorales
- Family: Parmeliaceae
- Genus: Cetreliopsis; M.J.Lai (1980)

Type species
- Cetreliopsis rhytidocarpa (Mont. & Bosch) Randlane & Saag (1980)

Genus of fungi

Cetreliopsis is a genus of four species of lichens in the family Parmeliaceae.

== Taxonomy ==
The genus was circumscribed by Ming-Jou Lai in 1980, with Cetreliopsis rhytidocarpa as the type species.

In 2017, Divakar and colleagues used a recently developed "temporal phylogenetic" approach to identify temporal bands for specific taxonomic ranks in the family Parmeliaceae, suggesting that groups of species that diverged within the time window of 29.45–32.55 million years ago represent genera. They proposed to synonymize Cetreliopsis with Nephromopsis, along with several other Parmelioid genera, so that all the genera within the Parmeliaceae are about the same age. Although some of their proposed taxonomic changes were accepted, the synonymization of the Parmelioid genera with Nephromopsis was not accepted.

== Species ==
- Cetreliopsis asahinae (M.Satô) Randlane & A.Thell (1995)
- Cetreliopsis endoxanthoides (D.D.Awasthi) Randlane & (Saag 1995)
- Cetreliopsis hypotrachyna (Müll.Arg.) Randlane & Saag (2003)
- Cetreliopsis rhytidocarpa (Mont. & Bosch) Randlane & Saag (1980)
