= Spot test (lichen) =

Chemical test for identifying lichens

A spot test in lichenology is a spot analysis used to help identify lichens. It is performed by placing a drop of a chemical reagent on different parts of the lichen and noting the colour change (or lack thereof) associated with application of the chemical. The tests are routinely encountered in dichotomous keys for lichen species, and they take advantage of the wide array of lichen products (secondary metabolites) produced by lichens and their uniqueness among taxa. As such, spot tests reveal the presence or absence of chemicals in various parts of a lichen. They were first proposed as a method to help identify species by the Finnish lichenologist William Nylander in 1866.

Three common spot tests use either 10% aqueous KOH solution (K test), saturated aqueous solution of bleaching powder or calcium hypochlorite (C test), or 5% alcoholic p-phenylenediamine solution (P test). The colour changes occur due to presence of particular secondary metabolites in the lichen. In identification key reference literature, the outcome of chemical spot tests serves as a primary characteristic for determining the species of lichens. There are several other less frequently used spot tests of more limited use that are employed in specific situations, such as to distinguish between certain species. Variations of the technique, including using filter paper to enhance visibility of reactions or examining under a microscope, accommodate different lichen types and pigmentations, with results typically summarised by a short code indicating the substance and reaction observed. Other diagnostic methods like ultraviolet (UV) light exposure can help identify lichen metabolites and distinguish between species, as some substances fluoresce under UV, aiding in the differentiation of closely related species.

== Tests ==
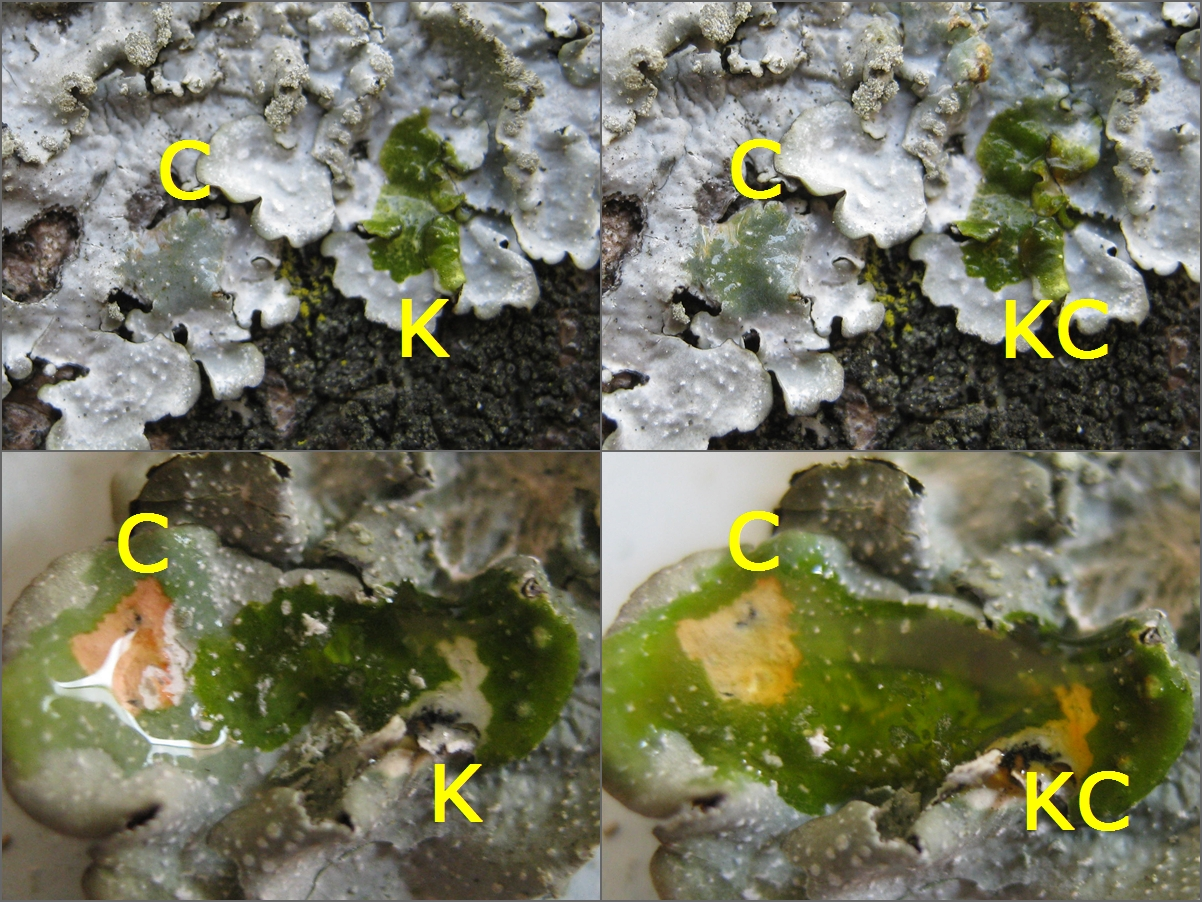
Spot tests on the foliose lichen Punctelia borreri showing thallus (top) and medulla (bottom). The pinkish-red colour change of the medulla in the C and KC tests indicate the presence of gyrophoric acid, a chemical feature that helps to distinguish it from similar species in the same genus.

Four spot tests are used most commonly to help with lichen identification.

=== K test ===
The reagent for the K test is an aqueous solution of potassium hydroxide (KOH) (10–25%), or, in the absence of KOH, a 10% aqueous solution of sodium hydroxide (NaOH, lye), which provides nearly identical results. A 10% solution of KOH will retain its effectiveness for about 6 months to a year. The test depends on salt formation and requires the presence of at least one acidic functional group in the molecule. Lichen compounds that contain a quinone as part of their structure will produce a dark red to violet colour. Example compounds include the pigments that are anthraquinones, naphthoquinones, and terphenylquinones. Yellow to red colours are produced with the K test and some depsides (including atranorin and thamnolic acid), and many β-orcinol depsidones. In contrast, xanthones, pulvinic acid derivatives, and usnic acid do not have any reaction.

Some common and widely distributed lichens that have lichen products with a positive reaction to K include Xanthoria parietina, which is K+ (red-purple) due to the parietin (an anthraquinone), and Dibaeis baeomyces, which is K+ (yellow), due to the didepside compound baeomycesic acid.

=== C test ===
This test uses a saturated solution of calcium hypochlorite (bleaching powder), or alternatively a dilute solution (5.25% is typically used) of sodium hypochlorite, or undiluted household bleach. These solutions are typically replaced daily since they break down within 24–48 hours; they break down even more rapidly when exposed to sunlight (less than an hour) and so are recommended to keep in a dark-coloured bottle. Other factors that accelerate the decomposition of these solutions are heat, humidity, and carbon dioxide.

Colours typically observed with the C test are red and orange-rose. Chemicals causing a red reaction include anziaic acid, erythrin, and lecanoric acid, while those resulting in orange-red include gyrophoric acid. Rarely, an emerald-green colour is produced, caused by reaction with dihydroxy dibenzofurans, such as the chemical strepsilin. Another rare colour produced by this test is yellow, which is observed with Cladonia portentosa as a result of the dibenzofuran usnic acid.

Some common and widely distributed lichens that have lichen products with a positive reaction to C include Lecanora expallens, which is C+ (orange) because of the xanthone thiophanic acid, and Diploschistes muscorum, which is C+ (red) because of the didepside diploschistesic acid.

=== PD test ===
p-phenylenediamine

This is also known as the P test. It uses a 1–5% ethanolic solution of para-phenylenediamine (PD), made by placing a drop of ethanol (70–95%) over a few crystals of the chemical; this yields an unstable, light sensitive solution that lasts for about a day. An alternative form of this solution, called Steiner's solution, is much longer lasting although it produces less intense colour reactions. It is typically prepared by dissolving 1 gram of PD, 10 grams of sodium sulfite, and 0.5 millilitres of detergent in 100 millilitres of water; initially pink in colour, the solution becomes purple with age. Steiner's solution will last for months. The phenylenediamine reacts with aldehydes to yield Schiff bases according to the following reaction:

R−CHO + H_{2}N−C_{6}H_{4}−NH_{2} → R−CH=N−C_{6}H_{4}−NH_{2} + H_{2}O

Products of this reaction are yellow to red in colour. Most β-orcinol depsidones and some β-orcinol depsides will react positively. The PD test, known for its high specificity towards substances that yield K+ yellow or red reactions, has largely replaced the simpler yet less conclusive K test. PD is poisonous both as a powder and a solution, and surfaces that come in contact with it (including skin) will discolour.

Some common and widely distributed lichens that have lichen products with a positive reaction to P include Parmelia subrudecta, which is PD+ (yellow) because of the didepside atranorin, and Hypogymnia physodes, which is PD+ (orange) because of the depsidone physodalic acid.

=== KC test ===
This spot test may be performed by wetting the thallus with K followed immediately by C. The initial application of K breaks down (via hydrolysis) ester bonds in depsides and depsidones. If a phenolic hydroxyl group is released that is meta to another hydroxyl, then a red to orange colour is produced as C is applied. Alectoronic acid and physodic acid produce this colour, while a violet colour results when picrolichenic acid is present. The CK test is a less commonly used variation that reverses the order of the application of chemicals. It is used in special cases when testing for orange colour produced by barbatic acid or diffractaic acid, such as is present in Cladonia floerkeana. Lugol's iodine is another reagent that may be useful in identifying certain species.

Hypogymnia tubulosa is a lichen that is KC+ (orange-pink) because of the depsidone physodic acid; Cetrelia olivetorum is KC+ (pink-red) due to the depsidone alectoronic acid.

=== Less common tests ===
There are several spot tests that are infrequently used due to their limited applicability, but may be useful in situations where particular lichen metabolites need to be detected, or to distinguish between certain species when other tests are negative.

- A 10% solution of barium hydroxide (Ba(OH)_{2}) gives a violet colour when tested with diploschistesic acid, a chemical found in some Diploschistes species.
- A saturated solution of barium peroxide (BaO_{2}), when tested with olivetoric acid, will turn a yellow colour that becomes green after a few minutes.
- A 1% (weight per volume) solution of ferric chloride (FeCl_{3}) in ethanol produces several possible colours when tested with compounds that have phenolic groups.
- The N test uses a 35% solution of nitric acid, which can be used to distinguish species of Melanelia from brown species of Xanthoparmelia.
- The S test uses a sulphuric acid solution (0.5% to 10%) brushed over an acetone-extracted, dried sample from a lichen thallus, followed by heating over a flame for 30 seconds or until colour develops. A persistent violet to bright pink colour indicates the presence of miriquidic acid and can be used to distinguish between the two morphologically similar snow lichens, Stereocaulon alpinum and S. groenlandicum without having to resort to more laborious chemical analysis.
- The Beilstein test involves heating a small sample of the substance to be tested on a copper wire; halogenated compounds cause a temporary deep green flame colour.
- An anisaldehyde reagent, when heated with acetone extracts, produces a magenta colour with usnic acid, though merochlorophaeic acids also give a similar red reaction.

== Performing spot tests ==
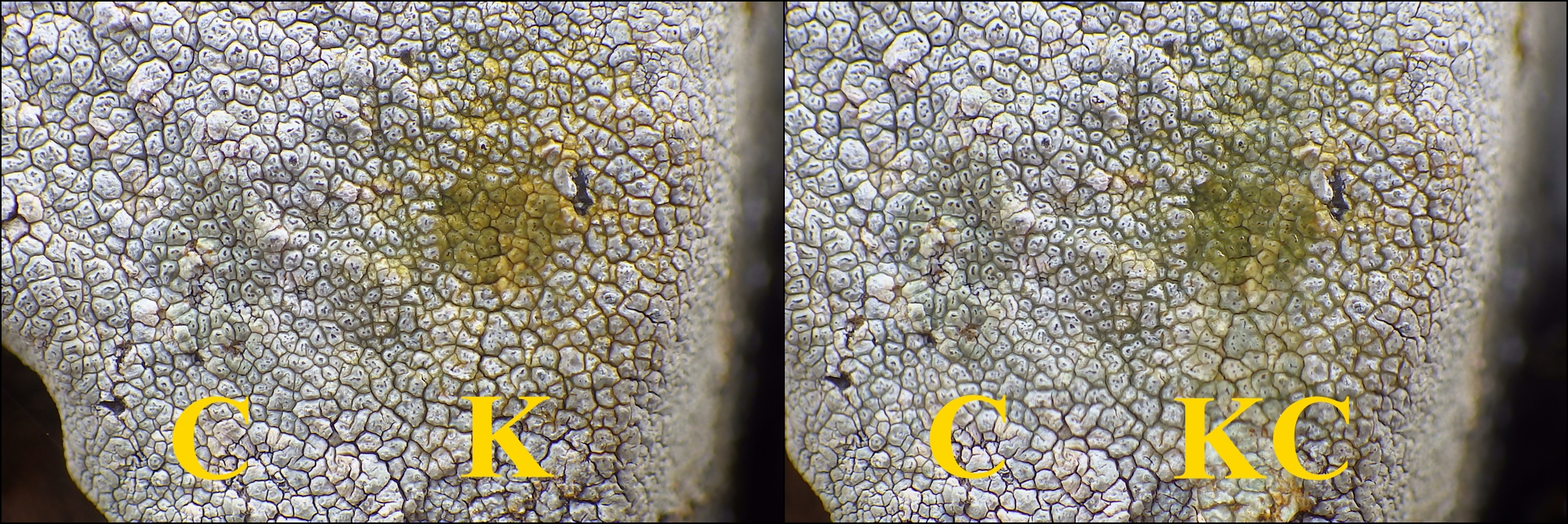
Chemical spot tests on the crustose and saxicolous lichen Aspicilia epiglypta

Spot tests are performed by placing a small amount of the desired reagent on the portion of the lichen to be tested. Often, both the cortex and medulla of the lichen are tested, and at times it is useful to test other structures such as soralia. One method is to draw up a small amount of the chemical into a glass capillary and touch it to the lichen thallus; a small paint brush is also used for this purpose. Reactions are best visualised with a hand lens or a stereo microscope. A razor blade may be used to remove the cortex and access the medulla. Alternatively, the solution can be applied to lichen features that lack a cortex or that leave the medulla exposed, such as soralia, pseudocyphellae, or the underside of squamules.

In a variation of this technique, suggested by the Swedish chemist Johan Santesson, a piece of filter paper is used to try to make the colour reaction more readily observable. The lichen fragment is pressed on the paper, and lichen substances are extracted with 10–20 drops of acetone. After evaporating the acetone, the lichen substances are left on the paper in a ring around the lichen fragment. The filter paper can then be spot tested in the usual way. In cases where the results of a spot test on the thallus are uncertain, it is possible to squash a thin section of the tissue on a microscope slide in a minimal amount of water and reagent under a cover slip. A colour change is visible under a low-power microscope objective, or when the slide placed against a white background. This technique is useful when testing lichens with dark pigments, such as Bryoria.

Spot tests may be used individually or in combination. The results of a spot tests are typically represented with a short code that includes, in order, (1) a letter indicating the reagent used, (2) a "+" or "−" sign indicating a colour change or lack of colour change, respectively, and (3) a letter or word indicating the colour observed. In addition, care should be taken to indicate which part of the lichen was tested. For example, "Cortex K+ orange, C−, P−" means the cortex of the test specimen turned orange with application of KOH and did not change under bleach or para-phenylenediamine. Similarly, "Medulla K−, KC+R" would indicate the medulla of the lichen was insensitive to application of KOH, but application of KOH followed immediately by bleach caused the medulla to turn red.

Occasionally, it takes some time for the colour reaction to develop. For example, in certain Cladonia species, the PD reaction with fumarprotocetraric acid can take up to half a minute. In contrast, the reactions with C and KC are usually fleeting and occur within a second of applying the reagent, so a colour change can easily be missed. There are several possible reasons that an anticipated test result does not occur. Causes include old and chemically inactive reagents, and low concentrations of lichen substances in the sample. If the colour of the thallus is dark, a colour change might be obscured, and other techniques are more appropriate, like the filter paper technique.

== Other tests ==
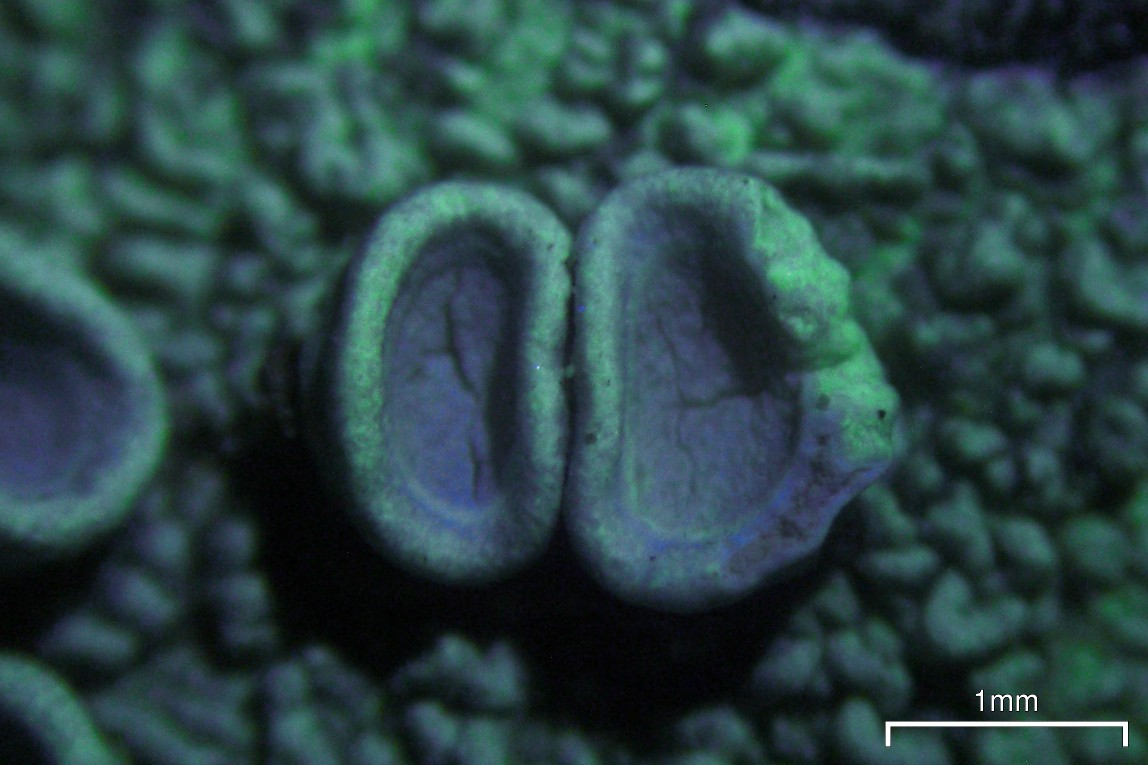
UV-illuminated thallus and apothecia of the crustose lichen Ochrolechia africana; the yellowish colour results from the fluorescence of lichexanthone.

It may sometimes be useful to perform other diagnostic measures in addition to spot tests. For example, some lichen metabolites fluoresce under ultraviolet radiation such that exposing certain parts of the lichen to a UV light source can reveal the presence or absence of those metabolites similarly to spot tests. Examples of lichen substances that give a bright fluorescence in UV are alectoronic, lobaric, and divaricatic acids, and lichexanthone. In some cases, the UV light test can be used to help distinguish between closely related species, such as Cladonia deformis (UV−) and Cladonia sulphurina (UV+, due to presence of squamatic acid). Only long-wavelength UV is useful for observing lichens directly.

More advanced analytical techniques, such as thin-layer chromatography, high-performance liquid chromatography, and mass spectrometry may also be useful in initially characterising the chemical composition of lichens or when spot tests are unrevealing.

== History ==
Finnish lichenologist William Nylander is generally considered to have been the first to demonstrate the use of chemicals to help with lichen identification. In papers published in 1866, he suggested spot tests using KOH and bleaching powder to get characteristic colour reactions—typically yellow, red, or green. In these studies he showed, for example, that the lichens now known as Cetrelia cetrarioides and C. olivetorum could be distinguished as distinct species due to their different colour reactions: C+ red in the latter, contrasted with no reaction in the former. Nylander showed how KOH could be used to distinguish between the lookalikes Xanthoria candelaria and Candelaria concolor because the presence of parietin in the former species results in a strong colour reaction. He also knew that in some cases the lichen chemicals were not evenly distributed throughout the cortex and the medulla due to the differing colour reactions on these areas. In the mid-1930s, Yasuhiko Asahina created the test with para-phenylendiamine, which gives yellow to red reactions with secondary metabolites that have a free aldehyde group. This spot test was later shown to be particularly useful in the taxonomy of the family Cladoniaceae.

== See also ==
- Microcrystallization
