= Polycauliona pancakeana =

Scientific classification
- Kingdom: Fungi
- Division: Ascomycota
- Class: Lecanoromycetes
- Order: Teloschistales
- Family: Teloschistaceae
- Genus: Polycauliona
- Species: P. pancakeana

Binomial name
- Polycauliona pancakeana E.A.Tripp, Raynor & J.Watts (2025)
- Holotype: Arapaho National Forest, Colorado

Species of lichen-forming fungus

Polycauliona pancakeana is a rare species of saxicolous (rock-dwelling) crustose lichen in the family Teloschistaceae. It forms a continuous mat of tiny, pale orange-yellow granules on granite rock in deeply shaded, humid locations along mountain streams and canyons. Described in 2025 from the Indian Peaks Wilderness of Colorado, the species is known from only four individuals at three sites in the southern Rocky Mountains. The lichen is distinguished by its extremely fine granular texture, presence of chlorinated anthraquinone pigments, and preference for cool, sheltered microhabitats protected from wind and direct sunlight.

== Taxonomy ==
Polycauliona pancakeana was described as a new species in 2025 on the basis of material collected during a targeted lichen inventory of the Indian Peaks Wilderness in the southern Rocky Mountains of Colorado. It belongs to the family Teloschistaceae and to the genus Polycauliona, one of several genera that were split from the former broad concept of Caloplaca following molecular studies of the family. The holotype was collected on steep granitic rock under a deep overhang in Hell Canyon, Arapaho National Forest, at 9,653 ft (2,942 m) (Grand County, Colorado), with three additional collections from similar habitats nearby. The specific epithet pancakeana honors Pancake Manzitto-Tripp, a labradoodle who accompanied the authors during fieldwork and whose pale orange-yellow coat and preference for moist mountain habitats mirror the characteristics of the lichen.

Nuclear ribosomal internal transcribed spacer sequence data from two collections form a strongly supported monophyletic lineage that is sister to a clade of Polycauliona phlogina and, in turn, closely related to P. flavogranulosa within the subfamily Xanthorioideae. Although genetically closest to P. phlogina, P. pancakeana differs from that and other similar species in its very fine, continuously granular thallus, presence of chlorinated anthraquinones, and narrower, two-celled ascospores with a relatively narrow septum.

== Description ==
Polycauliona pancakeana is a saxicolous (rock-dwelling) crustose lichen that forms a continuous mat of tiny, tightly adherent granules on siliceous granitic rock. The thallus is composed entirely of pale orange-yellow to yellow-green, more or less spherical corticate granules that are dull at a distance but appear glossy under magnification. The granules remain intact and do not break down into leprose (powdery) soredia or form areoles. The medulla is white to yellowish white but is difficult to discern because of the minute size of individual granules. Apothecia (fruiting bodies) are uncommon and small, slightly raised above the thallus surface, with orange to dirty orange, often roughened discs and lecanorine margins that are the same color or slightly paler and may carry thallus granules. In section, the epihymenium is golden orange to golden brown and reacts K+ (violet) and C+ (dark salmon to wine-red), over a hyaline (translucent) hymenium and a hyaline to very pale brown hypothecium. The asci are clavate and 8-spored, and the ascospores are hyaline, two-celled, 10–15 × 5–6 μm, with a relatively narrow isthmus that is often inconspicuous in immature spores. The photobiont is a trebouxioid green alga. Thin-layer chromatography shows parietin as the major secondary metabolite together with chlorinated anthraquinones (a particular set of lichen products called chemosyndrome C), a combination that helps distinguish the species from other granular members of Caloplaca (in the loose sense).

== Habitat and distribution ==
Polycauliona pancakeana is known only from three small populations in the Indian Peaks Wilderness and adjacent Roosevelt National Forest in the southern Rocky Mountains of Colorado. All known collections were made on siliceous granitic conglomerate in steep, moist drainages, where the lichen grows on shaded rock faces and under deep overhangs in subalpine and lower montane forest near rivers or streams. It occupies cool, deeply sheltered microhabitats that are protected from direct wind and high ultraviolet radiation and where persistent humidity prevents rapid desiccation, typically along streamside boulder fields and canyon walls between about 7,700 and 9,700 ft (2,300 and 3,000 m) elevation. Within these habitats the thalli form small patches on rock surfaces in mesic, relatively undisturbed backcountry sites, and the species is currently documented from only four mature individuals, leading the describing authors to treat it as extremely rare within a very restricted range.
