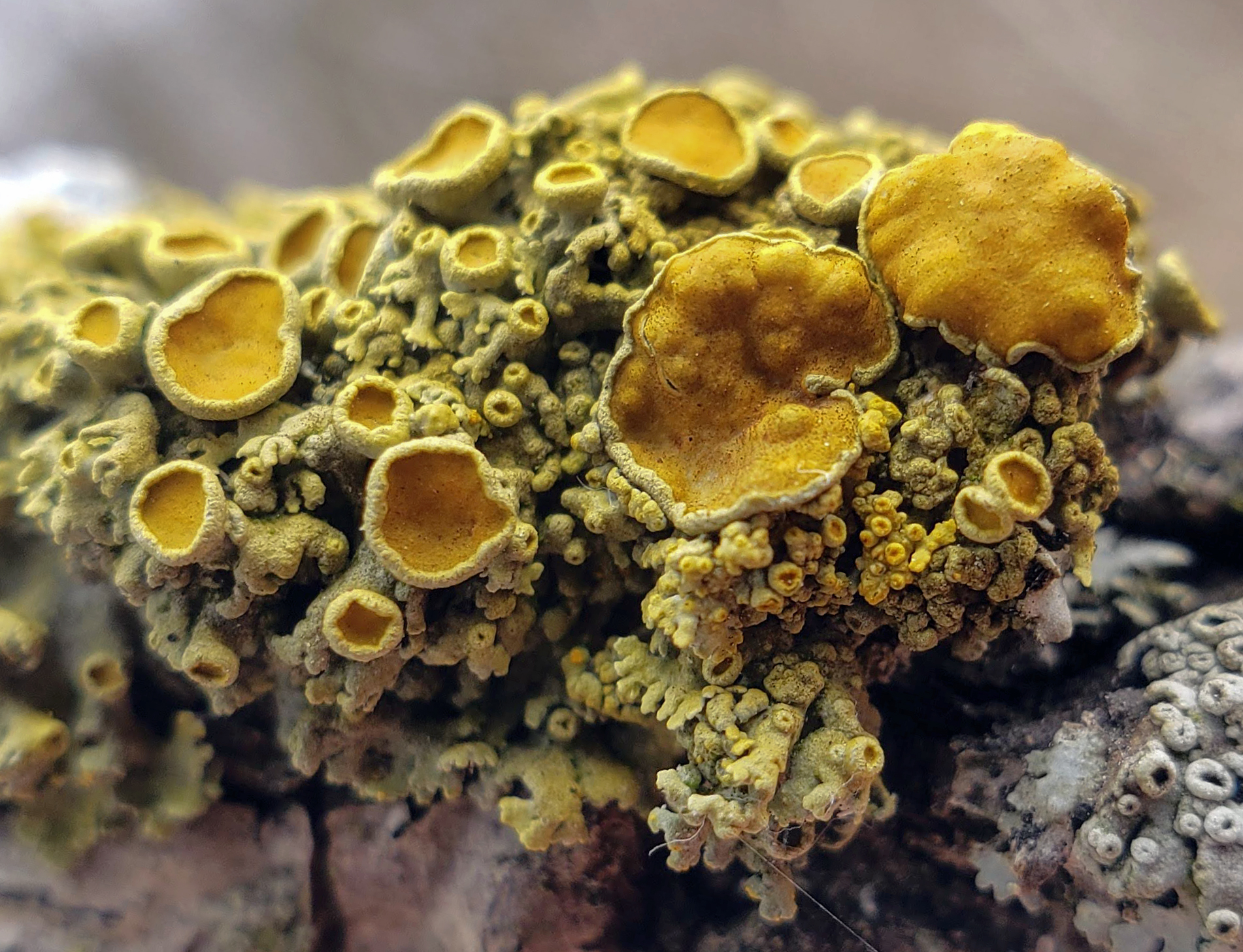
- Polycauliona polycarpa

Scientific classification
- Kingdom: Fungi
- Division: Ascomycota
- Class: Lecanoromycetes
- Order: Teloschistales
- Family: Teloschistaceae
- Genus: Polycauliona; Hue (1908)

Type species
- Polycauliona regalis (Vain.) Hue (1908)

Synonyms
- Massjukiella S.Y.Kondr., Fedorenko, S.Stenroos, Kärnefelt, Elix, Hur & A.Thell (2012)

= Polycauliona =

Genus of lichen-forming fungi

Polycauliona is a genus of lichen-forming fungi in the family Teloschistaceae.

== Species ==
- Polycauliona antarctica (Vain.) C.W.Dodge (1973)
- Polycauliona ascendens (S.Y.Kondr.) Frödén, Arup & Søchting (2013)
- Polycauliona austrogeorgica C.W.Dodge (1971)
- Polycauliona bolacina (Tuck.) Arup, Frödén & Søchting (2013)
- Polycauliona brattiae (W.A.Weber) Arup, Frödén & Søchting (2013)
- Polycauliona candelaria (L.) Frödén, Arup & Søchting (2013)
- Polycauliona charcotii Hue (1909)
- Polycauliona citrina C.W.Dodge (1948)
- Polycauliona comandorica Himelbrant, Stepanchikova & I.V.Frolov (2021) – Commander Islands
- Polycauliona coralligera Hue (1908)
- Polycauliona coralloides (Tuck.) Hue (1909)
- Polycauliona etesiae (Nyl.) I.V.Frolov, Himelbr. & Stepanch. (2025)
- Polycauliona fruticulosa (Darb.) Hue (1909)
- Polycauliona impolita (Arup) Arup, Frödén & Søchting (2013)
- Polycauliona inconspecta (Arup) Arup, Frödén & Søchting (2013)
- Polycauliona johnstonii C.W.Dodge (1948)
- Polycauliona kaernefeltii (S.Y.Kondr., D.J.Galloway & Goward) Frödén, Arup & Søchting (2013)
- Polycauliona leechii C.W.Dodge (1968)
- Polycauliona luctuosa Hue (1915)
- Polycauliona murrayi C.W.Dodge (1965)
- Polycauliona pancakeana E.A.Tripp, Raynor & J.Watts (2025)
- Polycauliona phryganitis (Tuck.) Hue (1909)
- Polycauliona pollinarioides (L.Lindblom & D.M.Wright) Frödén, Arup & Søchting (2013)
- Polycauliona polycarpa (Hoffm.) Frödén, Arup & Søchting (2013)
- Polycauliona prostrata (Hue) C.W.Dodge (1973)
- Polycauliona pulvinata C.W.Dodge & G.E.Baker (1938)
- Polycauliona regalis (Vain.) Hue (1908)
- Polycauliona rhopaloides Hue (1909)
- Polycauliona sparsa C.W.Dodge & G.E.Baker (1938)
- Polycauliona stellata (Wetmore & Kärnefelt) Arup, Frödén & Søchting (2013)
- Polycauliona tenax (L.Lindblom) Frödén, Arup & Søchting (2013)
- Polycauliona tenuiloba (L.Lindblom) Frödén, Arup & Søchting (2013)
- Polycauliona thamnodes (Poelt) Arup, Frödén & Søchting (2013)
- Polycauliona theloschistoides (Zahlbr.) C.W.Dodge (1971)
- Polycauliona ucrainica (S.Y.Kondr.) Frödén, Arup & Søchting (2013)
