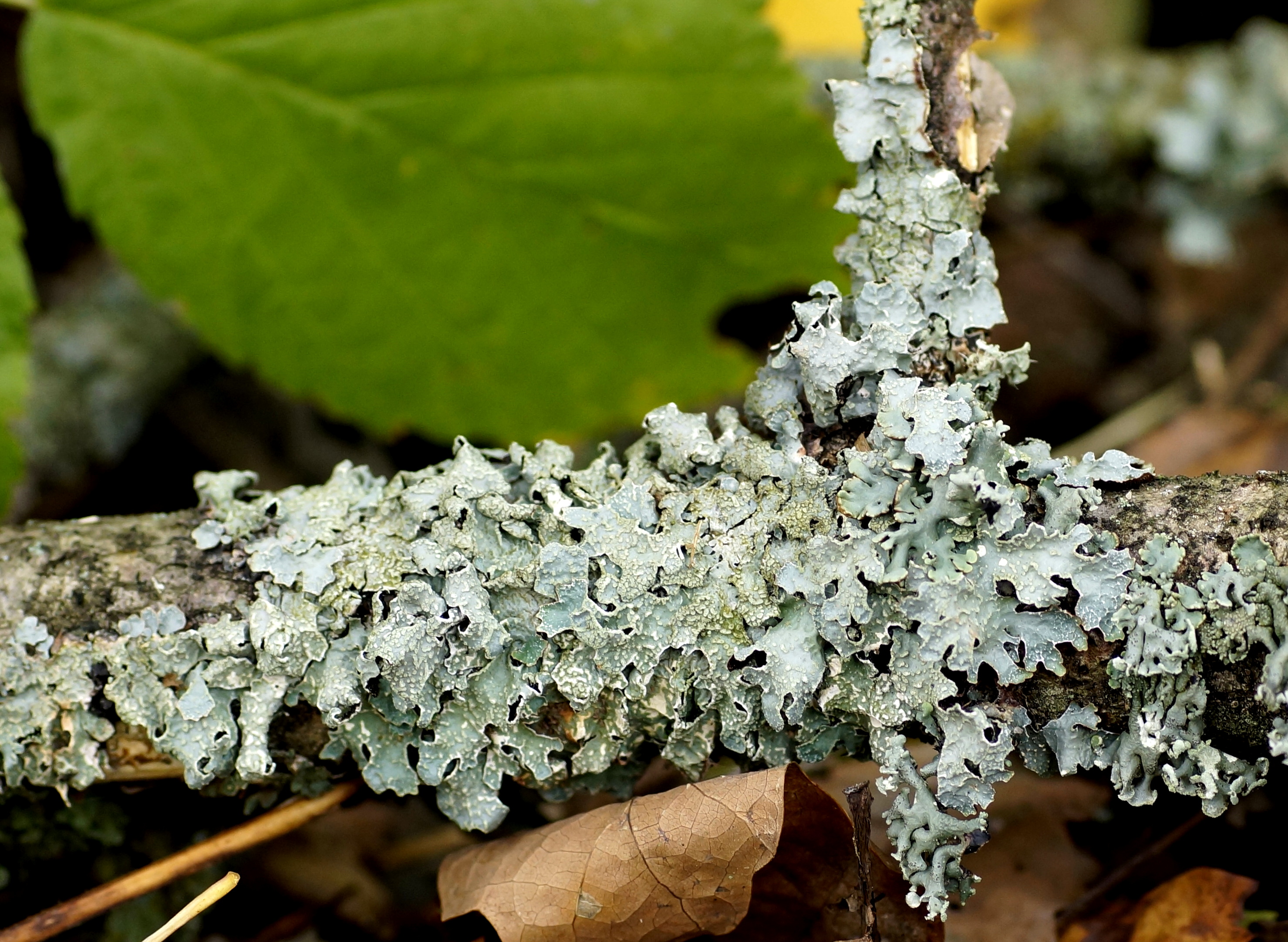
- C. olivetorum in Selbitz

Conservation status
- Secure (NatureServe)

Scientific classification
- Kingdom: Fungi
- Division: Ascomycota
- Class: Lecanoromycetes
- Order: Lecanorales
- Family: Parmeliaceae
- Genus: Cetrelia
- Species: C. olivetorum

Binomial name
- Cetrelia olivetorum (Nyl.) W.L.Culb. & C.F.Culb. (1968)

Synonyms
- Parmelia olivetorum Nyl. (1866)

= Cetrelia olivetorum =

Species of lichen-forming fungus

Cetrelia olivetorum is a species of lichen-forming fungus belonging to the family Parmeliaceae.

It has cosmopolitan distribution. In Nepal, Cetrelia olivetorum has been reported at 2,850 m elevation in a compilation of published records.

Cetrelia olivetorum has also been treated as part of the C. olivetorum species complex. A 2024 review noted that this complex has been resolved into four chemically distinct species – C. cetrarioides, C. chicitae, C. monachorum, and C. olivetorum sensu stricto (in the strict sense) – and that these taxa have already been assessed separately in some national Red Lists.
