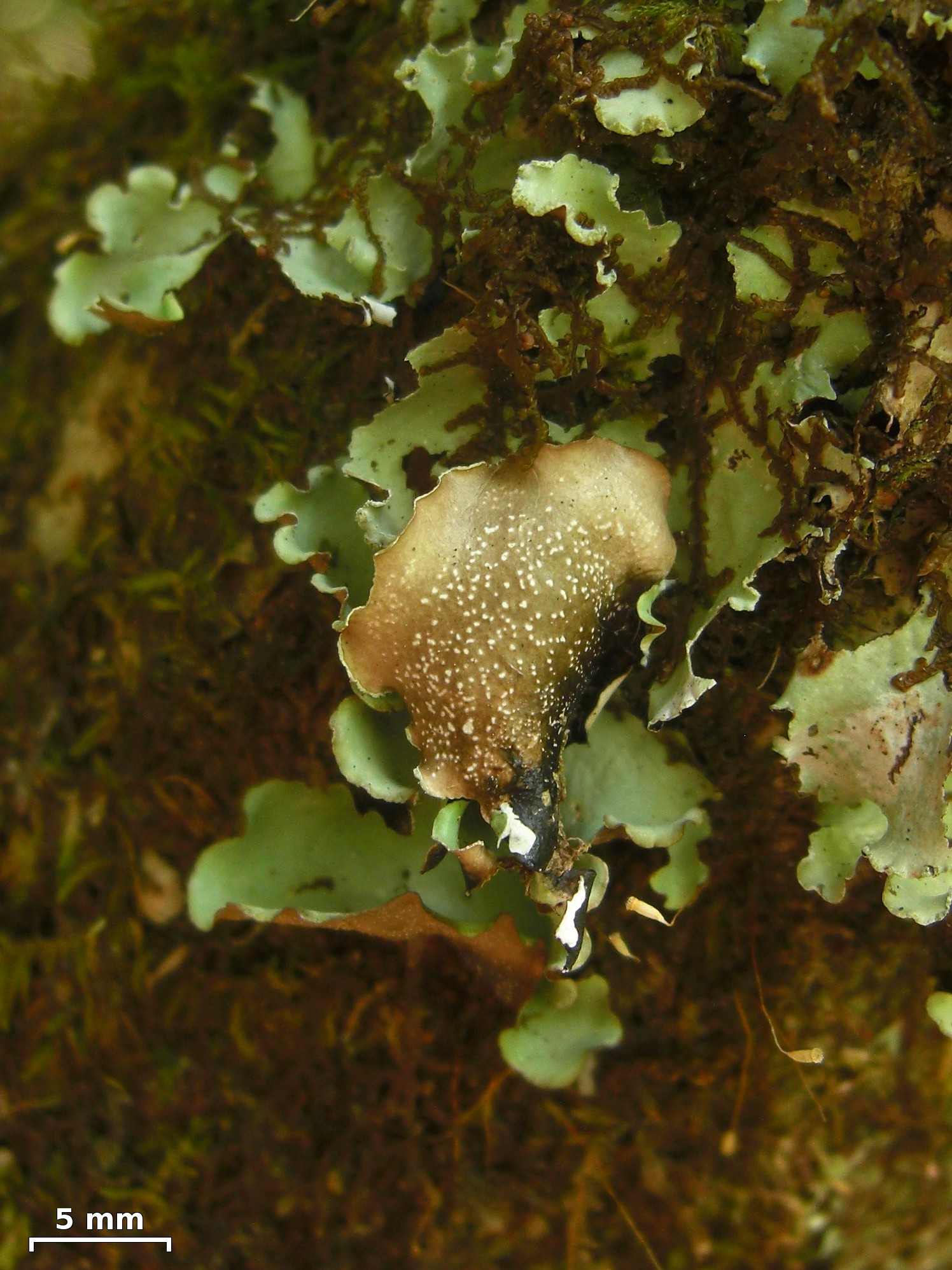

Conservation status
- Vulnerable (NatureServe)

Scientific classification
- Kingdom: Fungi
- Division: Ascomycota
- Class: Lecanoromycetes
- Order: Lecanorales
- Family: Parmeliaceae
- Genus: Cetrelia
- Species: C. monachorum

Binomial name
- Cetrelia monachorum (Zahlbr.) W.L.Culb. & C.F.Culb. (1977)

Synonyms
- Parmelia monachorum Zahlbr. (1930)

= Cetrelia monachorum =

Species of lichen-forming fungus

Cetrelia monachorum is a species of foliose lichen in the family Parmeliaceae. It was first described scientifically in 1930 by Alexander Zahlbruckner as a species of Parmelia. Husband and wife lichenologists William and Chicita Culberson transferred it into the genus Cetrelia in 1977. It is one of four chemically distinct species recognized within the Cetrelia olivetorum species complex.

It is found in Asia, Europe, and North America.
