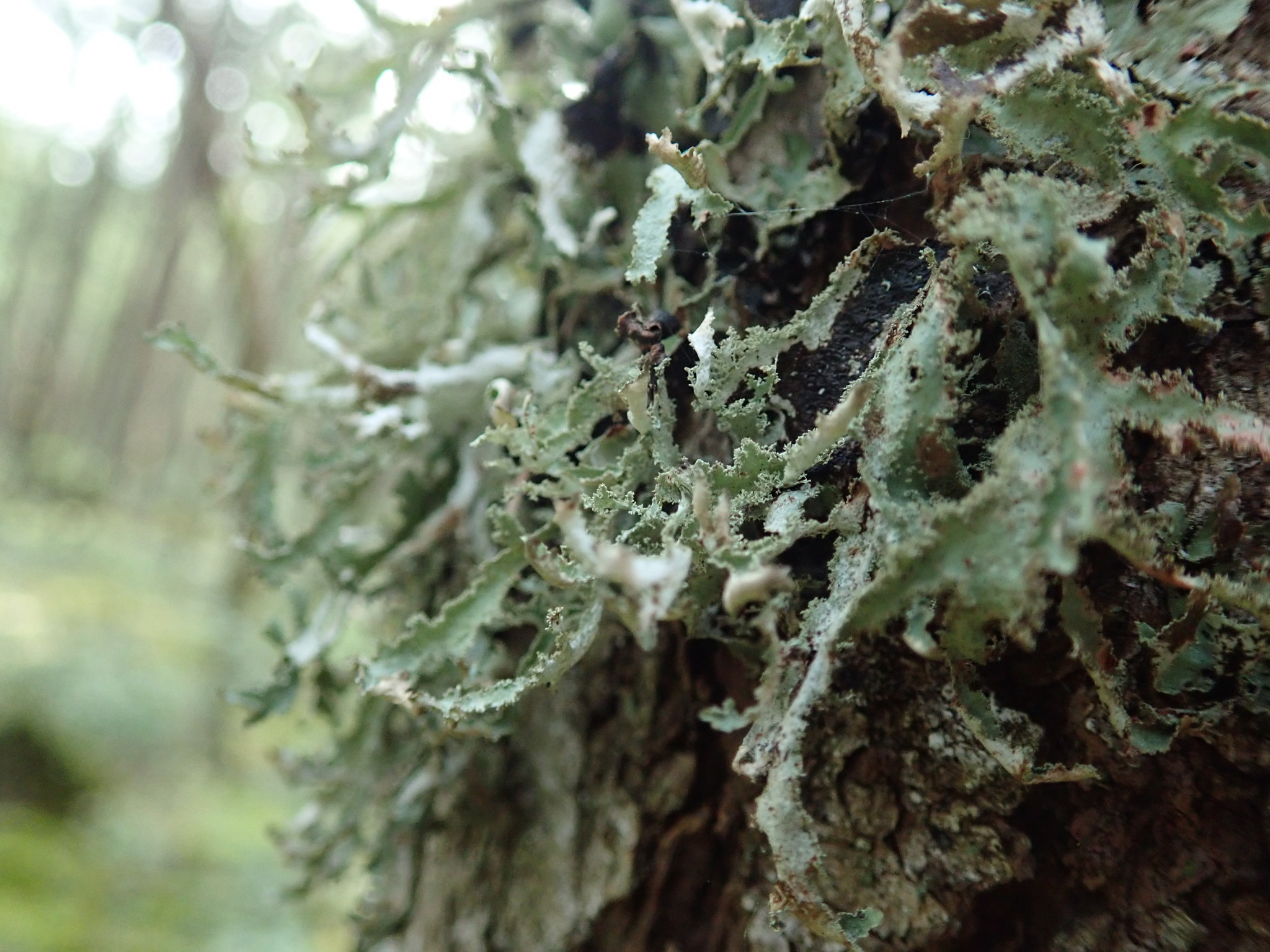

Conservation status
- Secure (NatureServe)

Scientific classification
- Kingdom: Fungi
- Division: Ascomycota
- Class: Lecanoromycetes
- Order: Lecanorales
- Family: Parmeliaceae
- Genus: Platismatia
- Species: P. herrei

Binomial name
- Platismatia herrei (Imshaug) W.L.Culb. & C.F.Culb. (1968)

Synonyms
- Cetraria herrei Imshaug (1954)

= Platismatia herrei =

Species of lichen

Platismatia herrei is a species of corticolous (bark-dwelling), foliose lichen in the family Parmeliaceae. It was first formally described as a species of Cetraria in 1968 by lichenologist Henry Imshaug. William and Chicita Culberson transferred it to the genus Platismatia in 1968. The lichen is found in western North America, ranging from southern Alaska to central California. It is distinguished from other members of its genus by the isidia that fringe the edges of its linear lobes; the Culbersons described it as "one of the most beautiful and intricately formed species in the genus".

Platismatia herrei reproduces primarily asexually through the production of isidia. Its thallus is whitish or pale, often splotched with black, with flat to curled inwards lobes that are narrow and linear. The upper surface is smooth to very minutely pitted or wrinkled. The lower surface is white or pale with discrete and delimited black zones. It has few black rhizines, present only at places of attachment.

Chemical analysis has revealed that P. herrei contains atranorin and caperatic acid. While P. herrei and its close relative P. stenophylla have largely sympatric ranges on the West Coast of North America, P. herrei has a slightly wider distribution.

Recent molecular phylogenetics studies have suggested that P. herrei and P. stenophylla may be recently diverged species or possibly morphological variants of the same species. They were not recovered as reciprocally monophyletic in genetic analyses, and the genetic distance between them was below that observed between other pairs of Platismatia species. Ancestral state reconstruction suggests that P. herrei, an asexual species, likely evolved from a sexually reproducing ancestor. Further research with increased sampling and additional genetic loci is needed to fully resolve the relationship between P. herrei and P. stenophylla.
