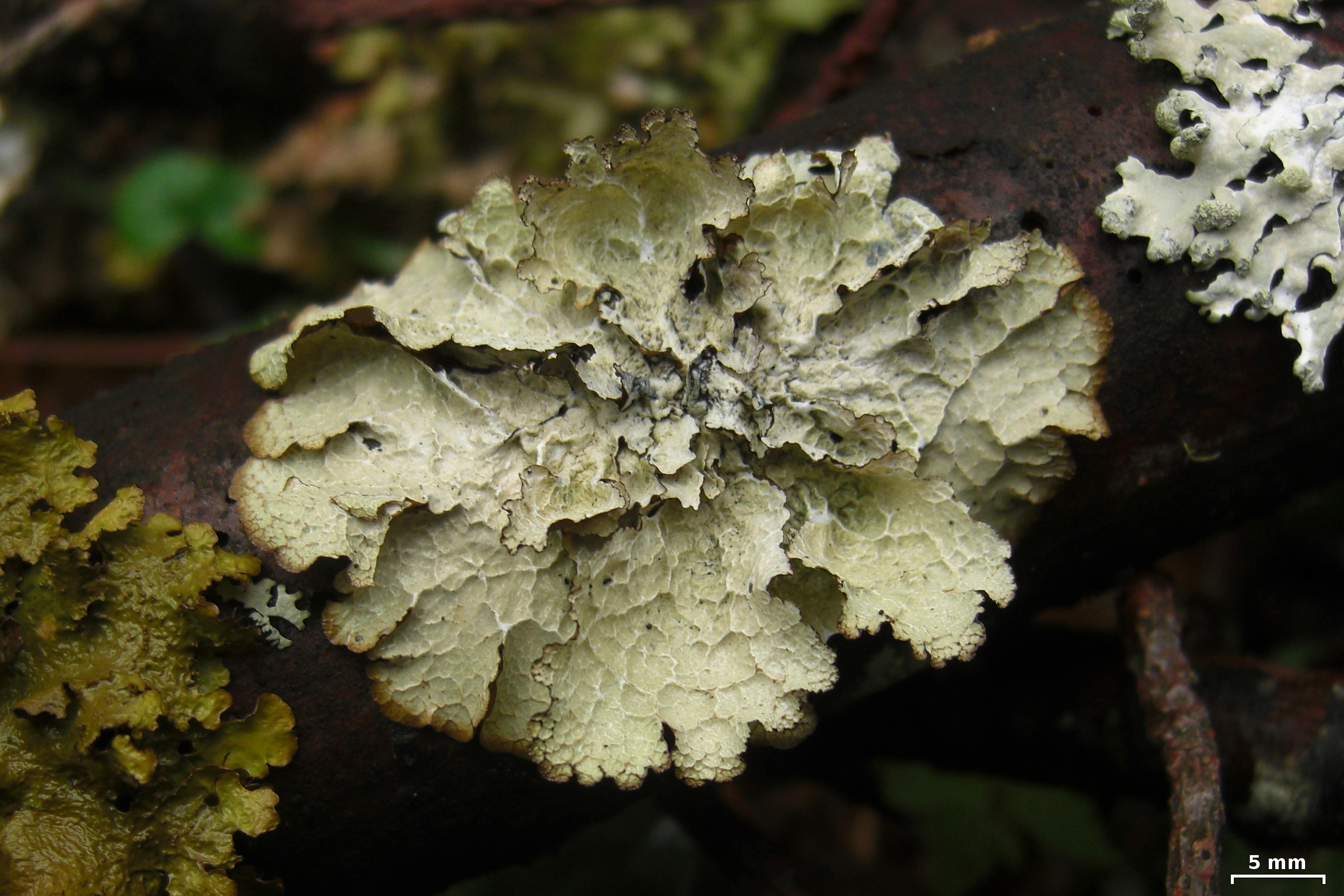

Conservation status
- Secure (NatureServe)

Scientific classification
- Kingdom: Fungi
- Division: Ascomycota
- Class: Lecanoromycetes
- Order: Lecanorales
- Family: Parmeliaceae
- Genus: Platismatia
- Species: P. tuckermanii

Binomial name
- Platismatia tuckermanii (Oakes) W.L.Culb. & C.F.Culb. (1968)

Synonyms
- Cetraria tuckermanii Oakes (1843)

= Platismatia tuckermanii =

Species of lichen

Platismatia tuckermanii is a species of corticolous (bark-dwelling), foliose lichen in the family Parmeliaceae. It is endemic to Eastern North America and is distinguished by its broad, loosely attached lobes and primarily sexual reproduction.

== Taxonomy ==
Platismatia tuckermanii was first formally described as a species of Cetraria in 1843 by American botanist William Oakes. The species epithet honours lichenologist Edward Tuckerman, who collected the type specimen in Cambridge, Massachusetts, in 1838. William and Chicita Culberson transferred the taxon to the genus Platismatia in 1968.

Recent phylogenetic analysis shows P. tuckermanii as a distinct, monophyletic species with high support. It forms a clade with P. glauca and P. wheeleri, with P. tuckermanii being the only sexually reproducing species in this group. Ancestral state reconstruction suggests that P. tuckermanii, a sexual species, likely evolved from an asexual ancestor.

== Description ==
The upper thallus of P. tuckermanii is ashy-white to gray, sometimes greenish, often brown at edges. It has broad, loosely attached, narrowly branched, rounded lobes with an irregularly or reticulately pitted surface. The lower surface is white to slightly tan, with well-defined patches becoming black to dark brown. It is minutely and reticulately pitted, sometimes mottled in appearance, but not punctate. Occasional pseudocyphellae may be present on the upper surface.

Platismatia tuckermanii has few rhizines, which are black at the center and pale or tipped with white at the margin. It reproduces primarily through sexual means. Its apothecia (fruiting bodies) are shiny red-brown, marginal or submarginal, broad, and usually perforate.

Chemical analysis has revealed that P. tuckermanii contains caperatic acid and atranorin as lichen products.

== Habitat and distribution ==
Platismatia tuckermanii is endemic to Eastern North America. It is found in Canada and the Southeastern United States. Although usually encountered growing on conifer bark, it is also known to grow on old wooden fenceposts.
