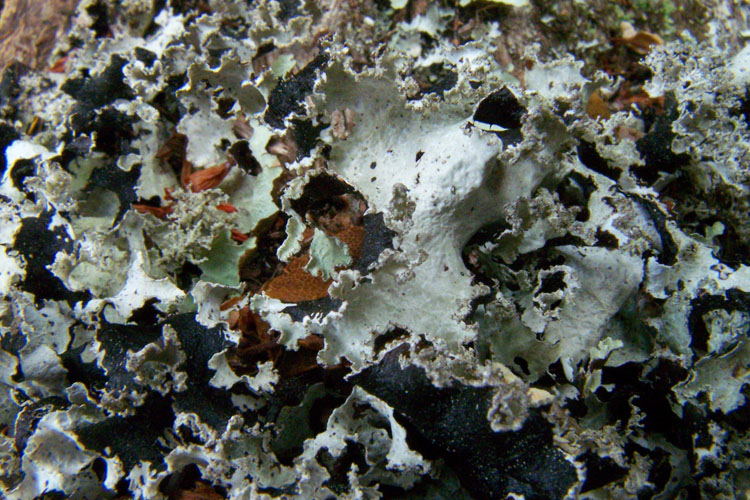
- Platismatia glauca growing on a Nothofagus tree on Isla Navarino, Chile.

Scientific classification
- Domain: Eukaryota
- Kingdom: Fungi
- Division: Ascomycota
- Class: Lecanoromycetes
- Order: Lecanorales
- Family: Parmeliaceae
- Genus: Platismatia; W.L.Culb. & C.F.Culb. (1968)

Type species
- Platismatia glauca (L.) W.L.Culb. & C.F.Culb. (1968)

Species
- See text

= Platismatia =

Genus of lichens

Platismatia is genus of medium to large foliose lichens in the family Parmeliaceae. The genus is widespread and contains 11 species. They resemble many other genera of foliose lichens in the Parmeliaceae, particularly Parmotrema, Cetrelia, and Asahinea. Most species are found in forests on the trunks and branches of conifer trees, although some species grow on rocks.

Species of Platismatia can be used to produce an orange-brown, yellow-brown, or brown dye, and at least one species was traditionally used to dye wool in Europe.

== Taxonomy ==
The genus Platismatia was historically classified within Cetraria by Erik Acharius in the early 1800s, along with several other superficially similar taxa that were later moved to other genera like Asahinea and Cetrelia. While molecular phylogenetics studies since the 2010s have challenged many traditional classifications of parmelioid lichens, particularly those formerly placed in Cetraria, Platismatia's historical delimitation has been consistently supported by molecular evidence as both monophyletic and well-defined.

As of 2023, there are 11 accepted species within the genus, with seven occurring in North America north of Mexico. A comprehensive molecular phylogenetic study published in 2023 examined relationships within Platismatia using both newly generated and existing internal transcribed spacer (ITS) sequence data. This study confirmed the monophyly of most currently recognized species, including P. wheeleri, which was described in 2011 and had previously lacked molecular confirmation.

The study revealed some taxonomically interesting patterns within the genus. The widespread P. glauca was found to contain two distinct, highly supported clades that showed no apparent morphological or geographic differences. Additionally, the western North American endemics P. herrei and P. stenophylla were not recovered as reciprocally monophyletic, suggesting they may represent a case of recent speciation or possibly conspecific taxa requiring further investigation.

Reproductive modes appear to play an important role in the evolution and diversification of Platismatia species. The genus includes examples of both sexually and asexually reproducing species, with some evidence suggesting that sexual reproduction can evolve from primarily asexual ancestors. Species producing asexual propagules (either isidia or soredia) generally show larger geographic ranges than their sexually reproducing relatives, though exceptions exist.

== Species ==
- Platismatia erosa W.L.Culb. & C.F.Culb. (1968)
- Platismatia formosana (Zahlbr.) W.L.Culb. & C.F.Culb. (1968)
- Platismatia glauca (L.) W.L.Culb. & C.F.Culb. (1968)
- Platismatia herrei (Imshaug) W.L.Culb. & C.F.Culb. (1968)
- Platismatia interrupta W.L.Culb. & C.F.Culb. (1968)
- Platismatia lacunosa (Ach.) W.L.Culb. & C.F.Culb. (1968)
- Platismatia norvegica (Lynge) W.L.Culb. & C.F.Culb. (1968)
- Platismatia regenerans W.L.Culb. & C.F.Culb. (1968)
- Platismatia stenophylla (Tuck.) W.L.Culb. & C.F.Culb. (1968)
- Platismatia tuckermanii (Oakes) W.L.Culb. & C.F.Culb. (1968)
- Platismatia wheeleri Goward, Altermann & Björk (2011)

== Gallery ==
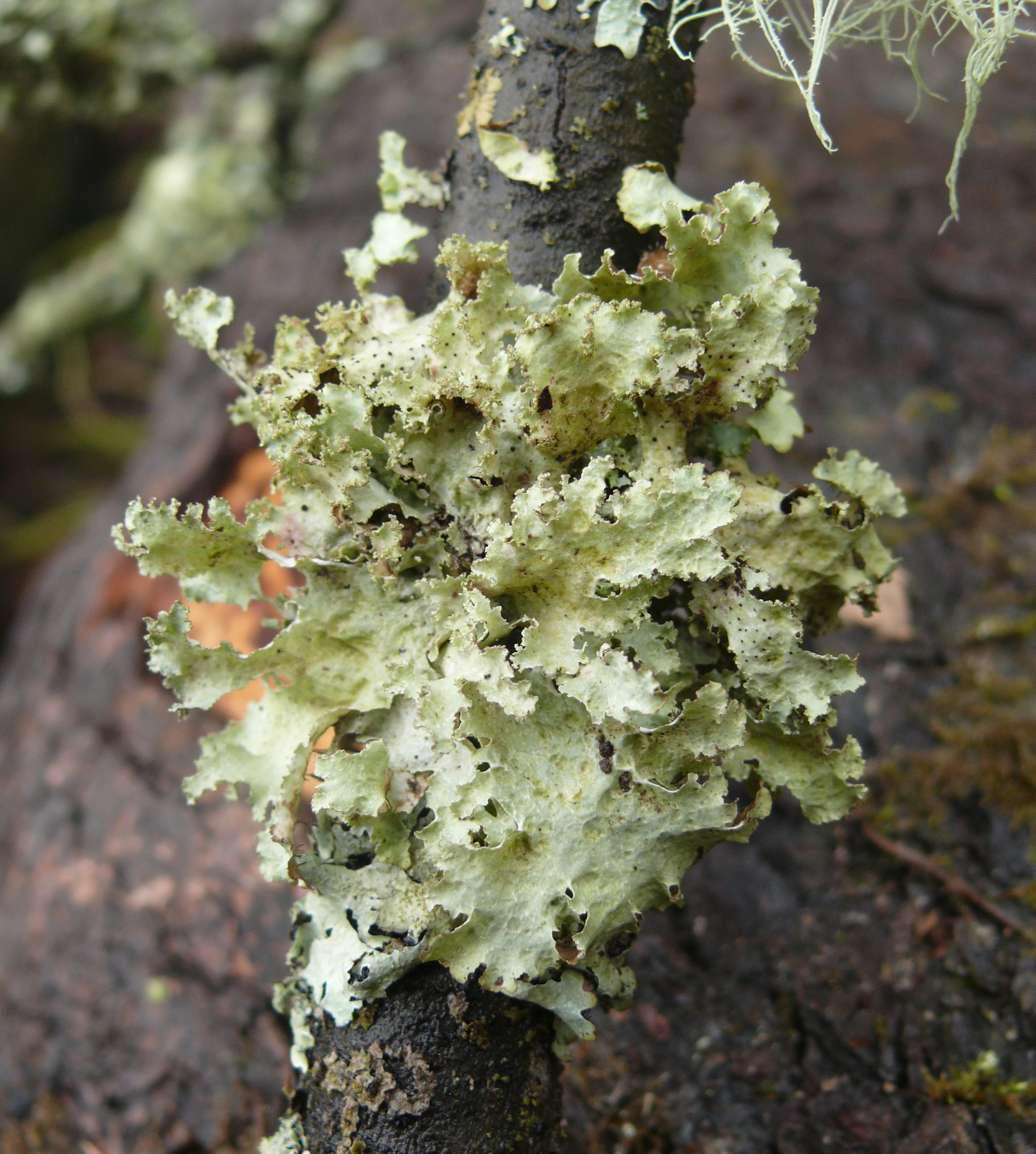
Platismatia glauca, Schwäbisch-Fränkische Waldberge, Germany

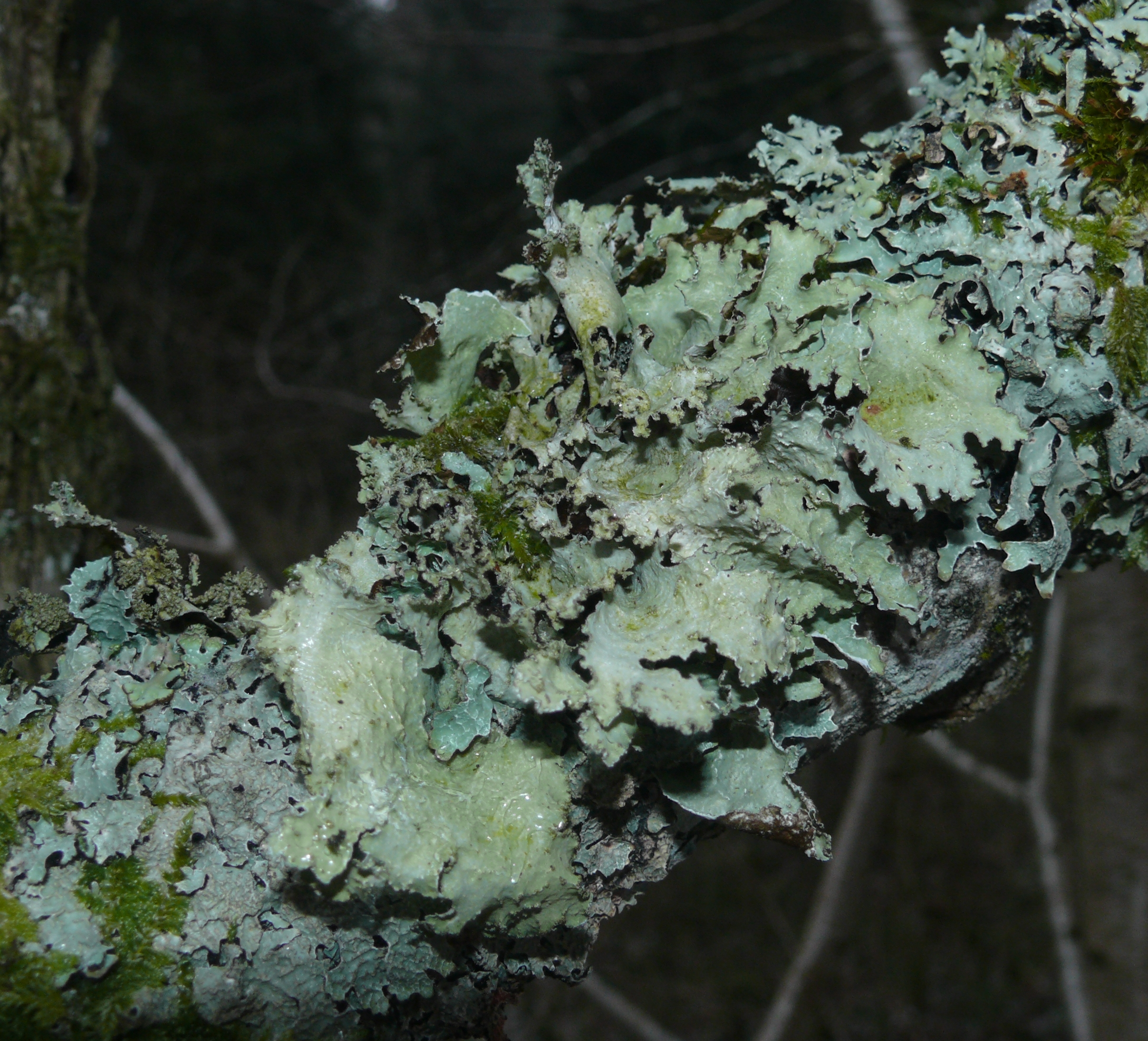
Platismatia glauca, Schwäbisch-Fränkische Waldberge, Germany

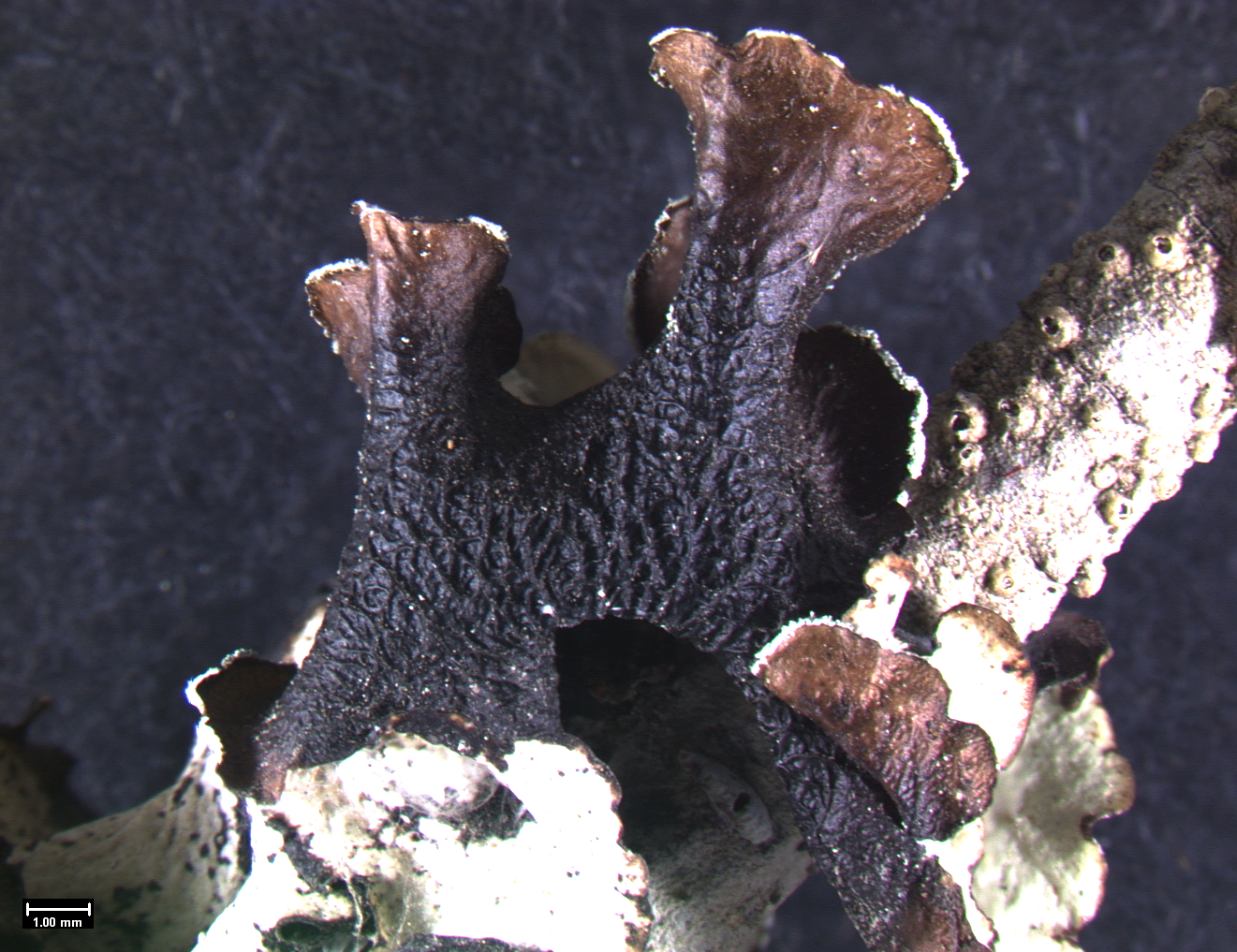
Platismatia wheeleri, Underside of thallus; Yelm, Washington, United States

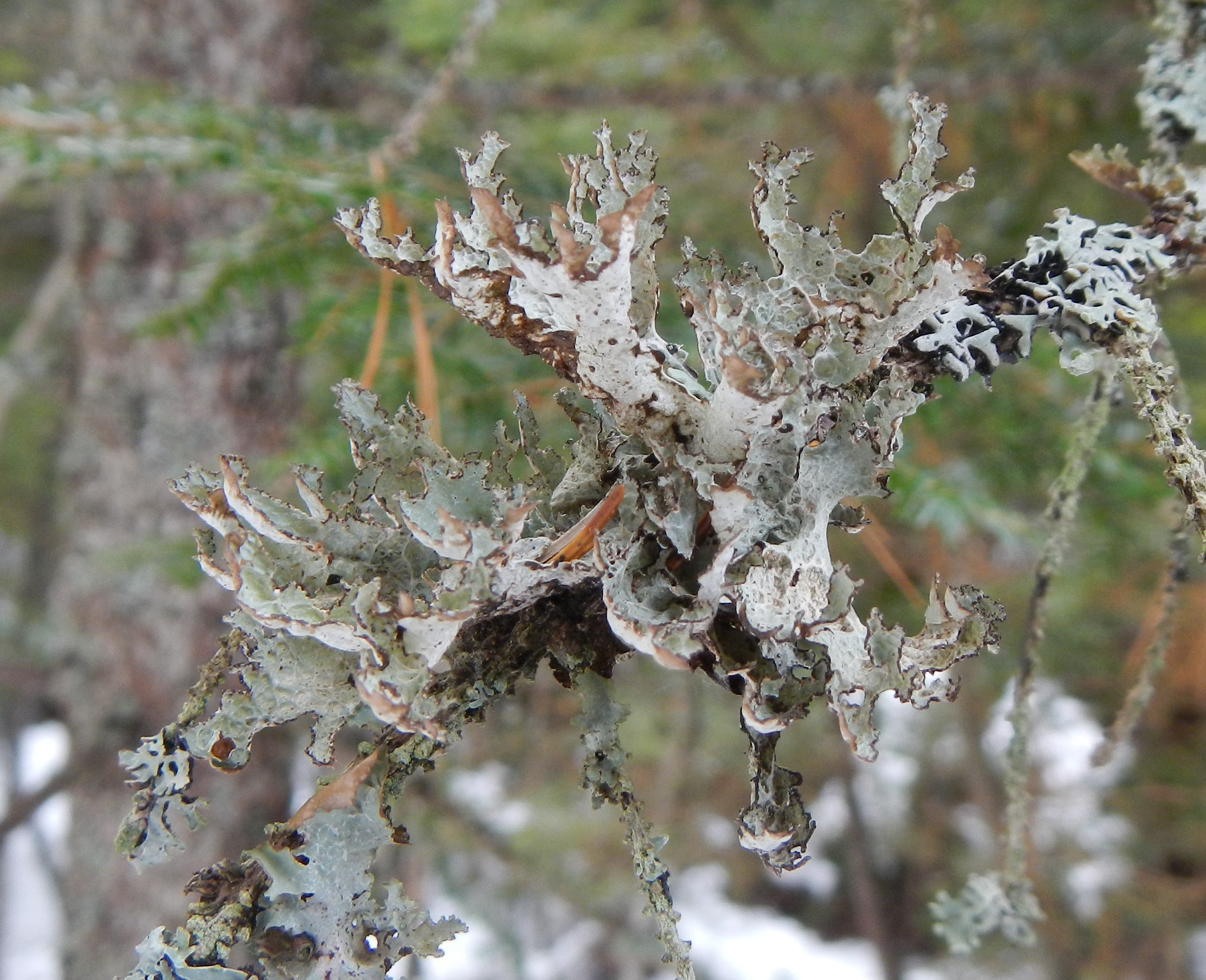
Platismatia tuckermanii, on Spruce branch in Nova Scotia, Canada
