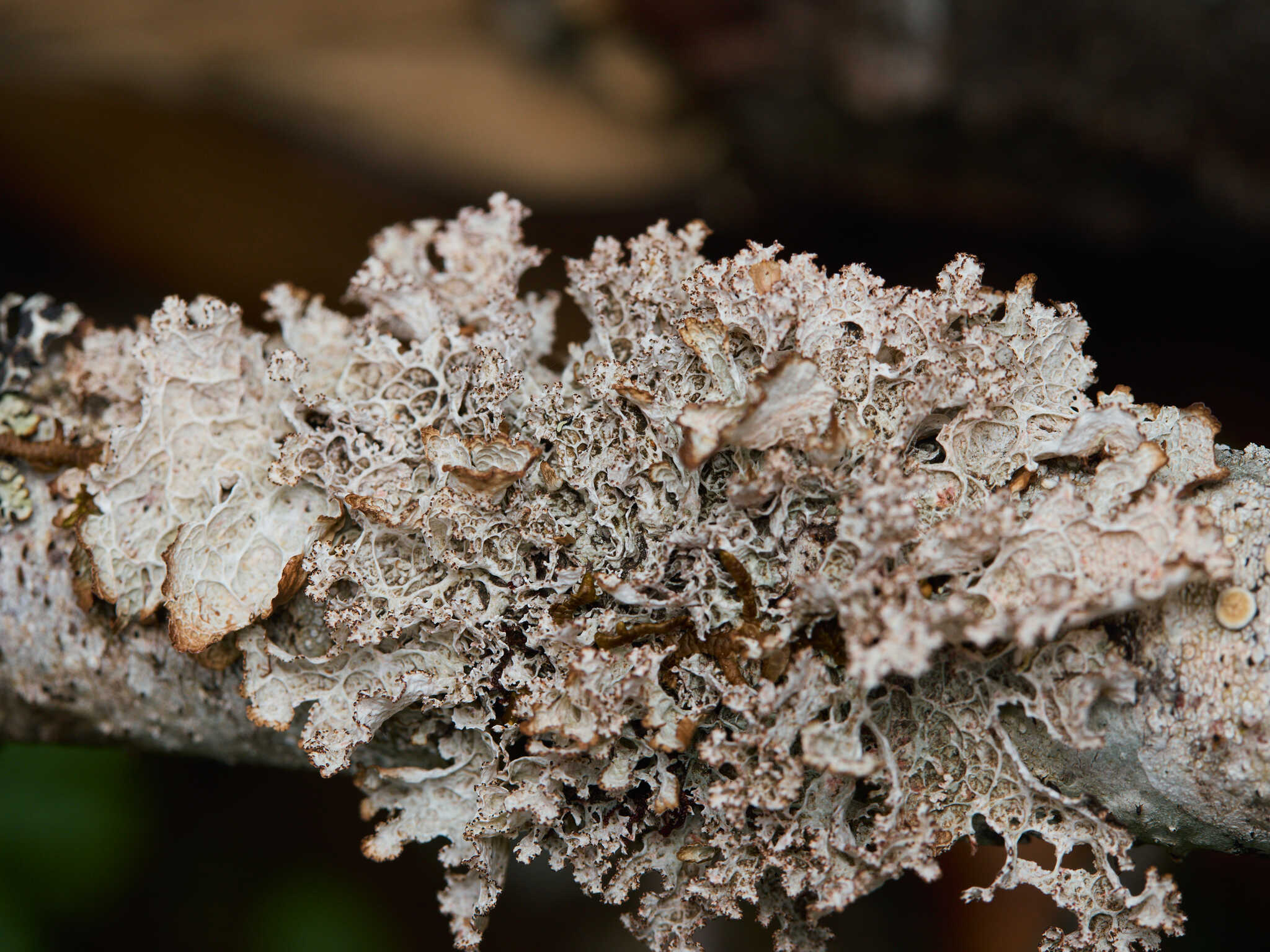
- By Sauk River

Conservation status
- Apparently Secure (NatureServe)

Scientific classification
- Kingdom: Fungi
- Division: Ascomycota
- Class: Lecanoromycetes
- Order: Lecanorales
- Family: Parmeliaceae
- Genus: Platismatia
- Species: P. lacunosa

Binomial name
- Platismatia lacunosa (Ach.) W.L.Culb. & C.F.Culb. (1968)

Synonyms
- Cetraria lacunosa Ach. (1803)

= Platismatia lacunosa =

Species of lichen

Platismatia lacunosa is a species of corticolous (bark-dwelling), foliose lichen in the family Parmeliaceae. Known predominantly from western North America, it reproduces primarily through sexual means, which is uncommon in the genus. The species is distinguished by its ridged surface and large, folded apothecia (fruiting bodies).

== Taxonomy ==
Platismatia lacunosa was first formally described in 1803 by Erik Acharius as a member of the genus Cetraria. William and Chicita Culberson transferred it to the genus Platismatia in 1968. Phylogenetic analysis has shown P. lacunosa to be a distinct, monophyletic species within Platismatia. Ancestral state reconstruction suggests that P. lacunosa, a sexually reproducing species, likely evolved from an asexual ancestor.

== Description ==
The upper thallus surface of P. lacunosa is greenish gray, gray to almost white, with margins that may become blackened. It is characterized by strong reticulations rising at right angles to the surface, creating ridges. The lower surface is black at the center, with chestnut brown edges, sometimes becoming white. It is often mottled and somewhat reticulately wrinkled, but not punctate. Occasional pseudocyphellae (small pores) may be present on the upper surface.

Platismatia lacunosa has few to abundant black rhizines, which are rarely produced. Apothecia, the reproductive structures, are uncommon. When present, they are large and folded with brown discs, and located on the margins or close by. The apothecia become expanded and irregular at maturity.

Chemical analysis has revealed that P. lacunosa contains atranorin, caperatic acid, and fumarprotocetraric acid.

== Habitat and distribution ==
Platismatia lacunosa is found in Asia, Europe, and western North America. In 2021, it was recorded from the Commander Islands in the Russian Far East.
