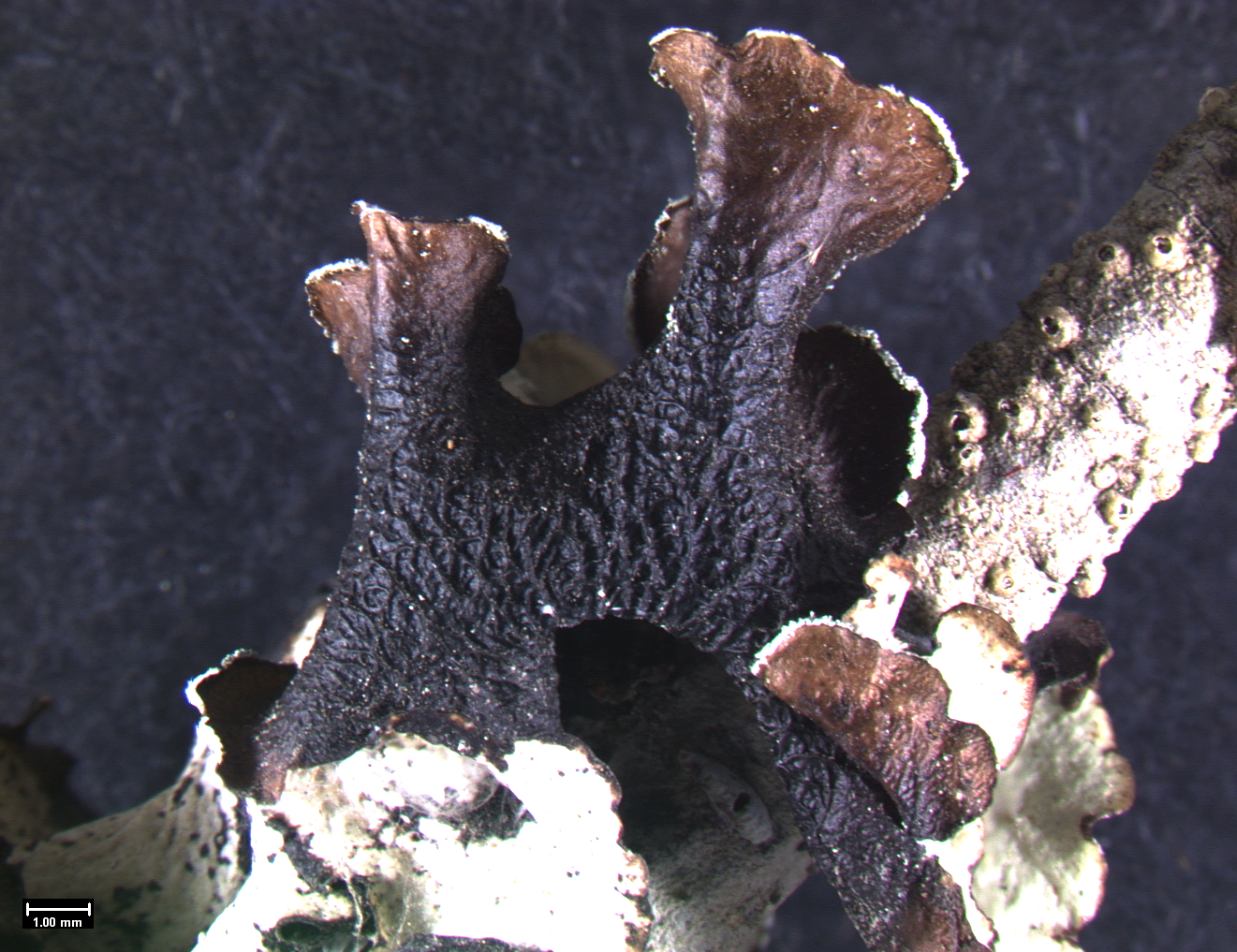

Scientific classification
- Domain: Eukaryota
- Kingdom: Fungi
- Division: Ascomycota
- Class: Lecanoromycetes
- Order: Lecanorales
- Family: Parmeliaceae
- Genus: Platismatia
- Species: P. wheeleri

Binomial name
- Platismatia wheeleri Goward, Altermann & Björk (2011)

= Platismatia wheeleri =

Species of lichen

Platismatia wheeleri is a species of foliose lichen in the family Parmeliaceae. Found in western North America, it is characterized by its whitish, smooth thallus and asexual reproduction through soredia. This lichen species is primarily found in western intermontane North America, from southern British Columbia to Washington, Idaho, and Oregon. It has also been discovered in southern California and the Tatra Mountains of Slovakia.

== Taxonomy ==
Platismatia wheeleri was first described in 2011 by Trevor Goward, Susanne Altermann, and Curtis Björk. The type specimen was found in Missoula County, Montana, USA. The species belongs to the genus Platismatia, which consists of about a dozen foliose lichens primarily found at temperate latitudes, mostly on trees. Recent phylogenetic analysis has shown P. wheeleri to be a distinct, monophyletic species with high support. It forms a clade with P. glauca and P. tuckermanii, with P. wheeleri and P. glauca being asexually reproducing species in this group. Ancestral state reconstruction suggests that P. wheeleri, a sorediate species, likely evolved from an isidiate ancestor.

Platismatia wheeleri is closely related to P. glauca, but differs in producing soredia instead of isidia. Some specimens initially identified as P. wheeleri in the field were later found to be P. glauca upon closer examination, indicating potential difficulty in field identification.

== Description ==
The upper surface of P. wheeleri is whitish and smooth to weakly pitted. It has corticate, ascending lobes that are loosely attached from the base, and are rather broad, rounded to irregular. These lobes are loosely attached at the base, and broad, ranging between 6–20 mm (0.2–0.8 in) in width. The lower surface is brown to black with a reticulum of narrow raised ridges, dull to shiny at tips, and corticate. P. wheeleri has no rhizines, or they are sparse and unbranched if present.

Platismatia wheeleri is similar to Platismatia glauca and some species of the genus Parmotrema. However, it can be distinguished from P. glauca by its uniform soredia and strongly sinuous marginal soralia. It also differs from Parmotrema species due to its medullary chemistry, containing caperatic acid, while Parmotrema perlatum contains stictic acid and P. austrosinense contains lecanoric acid.

== Habitat and distribution ==
Platismatia wheeleri occurs in arid inland Western North America. Additionally, it has been discovered in southern California and the Tatra Mountains of Slovakia. A recent study included ten sequences of P. wheeleri, all from specimens collected in Washington state. This lichen species is limited to regions with a Mediterranean precipitation regime, including humid winters and dry summers, and is generally absent from areas with continental or maritime precipitation patterns. Its distribution is entirely allopatric with its sexual relative (P. tuckermanii), while being mostly sympatric with the asexually reproducing P. glauca.
