= Platismatia formosana =

Scientific classification
- Domain: Eukaryota
- Kingdom: Fungi
- Division: Ascomycota
- Class: Lecanoromycetes
- Order: Lecanorales
- Family: Parmeliaceae
- Genus: Platismatia
- Species: P. formosana

Binomial name
- Platismatia formosana (Zahlbr.) W.L.Culb. & C.F.Culb. (1968)

Synonyms
- Cetraria formosana Zahlbr. (1933)

Species of lichen

Platismatia formosana is a species of corticolous (bark-dwelling), foliose lichen in the family Parmeliaceae. Found in the mountains of Taiwan, it was first formally described as a species of Cetraria in 1933 by Alexander Zahlbruckner. William and Chicita Culberson transferred it to the genus Platismatia in 1968. The species epithet formosana refers to its distribution, as "Formosa" is the name formerly used in Western literature to refer to Taiwan. It contains the lichen products atranorin, caperatic acid, and an unidentified yellow pigment.
