= Platismatia erosa =

Scientific classification
- Domain: Eukaryota
- Kingdom: Fungi
- Division: Ascomycota
- Class: Lecanoromycetes
- Order: Lecanorales
- Family: Parmeliaceae
- Genus: Platismatia
- Species: P. erosa

Binomial name
- Platismatia erosa W.L.Culb. & C.F.Culb. (1968)

Species of lichen

Platismatia erosa is a species of corticolous (bark-dwelling), foliose lichen in the family Parmeliaceae. Found in Asia, it was formally described as a new species in 1968 by William and Chicita Culberson. The species epithet erosa refers to the "eroded" quality of the reticulations on the upper thallus surface.

Platismatia erosa reproduces primarily asexually through the production of isidia, which are small outgrowths on the thallus surface. The lichen's upper thallus is light tan to ashy gray, becoming brown at the lobe margins, and has a broadly reticulately ridged and veined surface with pseudocyphellae (small pores). Its lower surface is black with a light brown marginal zone and is punctate (dotted). The lichen has few black rhizines, which are simple to fasciculate and confined to older parts of the thallus.

The lichen has been recorded from Japan, Taiwan, Java, Vietnam, Nepal, the Philippines, and Sikkim, and Tibet. Chemical analysis of the lichen (using thin-layer chromatography) revealed two lichen products previously unknown in genus Platismatia, pannaric acid and jackinic acid. Two chemotypes of P. erosa have been identified, containing different proportions of these substances. More recent chemical analysis has also identified atranorin, caperatic acid, and an unidentified yellow pigment in P. erosa.

Phylogenetic analysis has shown that P. erosa is closely related to P. norvegica, with the two species forming a strongly supported sister relationship. Genetic distance studies support its status as a distinct species within the genus Platismatia.
