= Platismatia interrupta =

Scientific classification
- Domain: Eukaryota
- Kingdom: Fungi
- Division: Ascomycota
- Class: Lecanoromycetes
- Order: Lecanorales
- Family: Parmeliaceae
- Genus: Platismatia
- Species: P. interrupta

Binomial name
- Platismatia interrupta W.L.Culb. & C.F.Culb. (1968)

Species of lichen

Platismatia interrupta is a species of foliose lichen in the family Parmeliaceae. Found in southern Russian Far East, and Japan, it was formally described as a new species in 1968 by William and Chicita Culberson. The species epithet interrupta refers to the indistinct and discontinuous reticulation of the upper thallus surface. The lichen of one of the most common foliose macrolichens in Japan, particularly at high elevations, where it grows on tree trunks and on boulders. The authors called it the "Far Eastern equivalent" of the common and widespread Platismatia glauca, which is absent in Asia.
