= Loxospora cristinae =

Scientific classification
- Domain: Eukaryota
- Kingdom: Fungi
- Division: Ascomycota
- Class: Lecanoromycetes
- Order: Sarrameanales
- Family: Sarrameanaceae
- Genus: Loxospora
- Species: L. cristinae

Binomial name
- Loxospora cristinae Guzow-Krzem., Łubek, Kubiak & Kukwa (2018)

Species of lichen

Loxospora cristinae is a fungal species classified in 2018, found in a few European countries. It belongs to the division Ascomycota and the family Sarrameanaceae. It was first identified and described in the 19th century, but the species would not be correctly classified until almost two centuries later. Loxospora cristinae is a sterile crustose lichen, meaning it reproduces by a type of vegetative spore that has evolved specifically to produce morphological structures.

== Taxonomy ==
Loxospora cristinae was first classified by Swiss biologist Anton Gisler in the 1800s in central Switzerland. In the mid-1900s, its presence was documented in several other regions of Switzerland. Then in 1989, it was documented in the Swiss forest Meriwald. In 1991, it was incorrectly classified as Lecidella alba, a rim lichen that has roughly circular fruiting discs. Shortly after in 1992, the species was examined by more experienced lichenologists, but a conclusive classification could not be reached.

A little over two decades later in 2015, it was recorded for the first time in the Rothwald forest of Austria. This forest lies in the Northern Limestone Alps in the southwest of lower Austria. Rothwald forest is a protected area, and as a result, scientists had limited accessibility to this area and could not study the development of Loxospora cristinae.

Finally in 2018, Polish researchers performed field lichen inventories and herbarium studies in Poland's forests. They came across a sterile crustose lichen species and collected 18 specimens in total for future examination. After completing DNA extraction and sequencing, PCR amplification, and phylogenetic analysis, they came to the conclusion that this was a fungal species recorded only a few other times. They named this species Loxospora cristinae in honor of Polish lichenologist Krystyna Czyzewska, a researcher who has contributed significantly to the knowledge of lichen diversity in Poland. Loxospora cristinae forms a distinct and highly supported clade. Later that same year, Loxospora cristinae was identified in the Black Forest in Germany. In 2019, it was rediscovered and recognized in Swiss forests. Similar species have been documented in Ukraine, but this species has yet to be identified there. Because of the rarity of its occurrence and the fact that it is difficult or nearly impossible to classify sterile lichens based on morphological data, the precise classification of Loxospora cristinae remains unknown. Molecular methods and DNA markers were needed to classify this species.

== Description ==
Loxospora cristinae is a sterile lichen, meaning that it lacks ascomata, a feature that helps to determine the systematic position of a fungus. This is another reason it has been so difficult to classify.

The thallus surface is smooth to cracked areolate, with a finely cracked cortex, exposing the underlying medulla. The cortex may also be folded. Loxospora cristinae is partly verruculose (warty); these verruculose parts are about 300 μm in width. The non-verruculose parts are up to 120 μm thick. This species has a grayish white to greenish white thallus, measuring 0.5 cm wide and 2.5 cm in diameter. On the thallus are localized structures of soredia (powdery propagules) called soralia. Soralia are either confluent from the beginning or are at first discrete and punctiform, become irregular, and then form a granular, somewhat continuous crust. They are white to greenish gray and sometimes appear pale brown in color and are 35–75 μm in diameter. The soredia wall is distinct with some short, projecting hyphae.

== Habitat and ecology ==
Loxospora cristinae is usually found in a moderately oceanic climate in regions with short, cool summers, and long, snow-rich winters. Rainfall occurs year-round, averaging 1,250–1,400 mm (49–55 in) in some areas. The highest temperature difference across regions where this fungus is found is 16 °C (61 °F), with the lowest temperature difference being 5 °C (41 °F). Loxospora cristinae likes shady conditions with high air humidity.

Loxospora cristinae is corticolous, meaning that it grows and lives on tree bark. The rocks and boulders it is found on are often densely covered by mosses. The vegetation it is found in often includes mixed mountain forests that are partially canopied. The trees in these forests and which Loxospora cristinae is found on includes beech, white fir, spruce, sycamore maple, and some deciduous. These forests often have trees with a diverse age structure, high amounts of wood litter and deadwood, rich soil, and conifers that reach heights of almost 60 m (200 ft). In Poland, it is found primarily on smooth bark in shady forests. Usually, it grows on the part of the bark that is shaded by neighboring conifers. These forests always have long ecological continuity, with German forests bearing similar conditions.

Species accompanying Loxospora cristinae are mainly mosses and other lichens with little ecological specificity, such as Loxospora elatina. This fungal species is often thicker and more pronounced, distinctly yellow, and contains different secondary metabolites than that of L. cristinae. Surrounding species growth is connected to global warming and increased pH of substrates. Other surrounding species are additionally associated with an oceanic climate that Loxospora cristinae is known to be found in. Beyond that, it is a good indicator species of long ecological continuity.

Loxospora cristinae is distinguishable from similar species Loxospora lecanoriformis, as the latter species produces apothecia whereas the former produces soredia to asexually reproduce. It can also be easily confused with Ochrolechia microstictoide, but is again distinguishable because this species contains different lichen products than L. cristinae. It is also often confused with Lecanora farinaria and Loxospora substerilis, but as the case with Ochrolechia microstictoide, Loxospora cristinae produces different secondary metabolites.

== Geographical distribution ==
Loxospora cristinae has been documented in the Southern region of the Black Forest Southeast of Freiburg, Germany 700 m (2,300 ft) above sea level. In Poland, it has been identified in Northeastern and Central regions, often in well-preserved forests such as the Bialowieza National Park. It has only been documented in lower regions of Austria. It was first found in Switzerland in the 1800s and has only recently been officially identified in this country. Similar species have been documented in Ukraine, but there has been no official identification of Loxospora cristinae yet. This species has only been found in Europe and all finds come from forests.

== Unique aspects ==
The soralia on Loxospora cristinae contain the secondary metabolite 2'-O-methylperlatoic acid identified using thin-layer chromatography. This is unusual in epiphytic lichens (Tonsberg 1992). It has only been found in two other documented fungal species in Europe, with one of them only being recently discovered. Loxospora cristinae is a sister species to all other Loxospora species that produce this secondary metabolite, yet is still distinct from those species.

The pharmaceutical aspects of this species are still unknown and further research needs to be conducted.

Loxospora cristinae is seemingly rare and should be classified as in danger of extinction. Because it is an indicator of long ecological continuity and is accompanied by species that are signifiers of global warming and climate change, Wirth and colleagues suggest that it needs to be examined further for the potential role it plays in identifying patterns and effects of climate change.
