= Platismatia regenerans =

Scientific classification
- Domain: Eukaryota
- Kingdom: Fungi
- Division: Ascomycota
- Class: Lecanoromycetes
- Order: Lecanorales
- Family: Parmeliaceae
- Genus: Platismatia
- Species: P. regenerans

Binomial name
- Platismatia regenerans W.L.Culb. & C.F.Culb. (1968)

Species of lichen

Platismatia regenerans is a species of corticolous (bark-dwelling), foliose lichen in the family Parmeliaceae. Found in Borneo, it was formally described as a new species in 1968 by William and Chicita Culberson. The type specimen was collected by Mason Hale from the Kinabalu National Park in Sabah, at an elevation of 2,000 m (6,600 ft). The species epithet refers to the "regenerative lobulae" that occur on older parts of the thallus.
