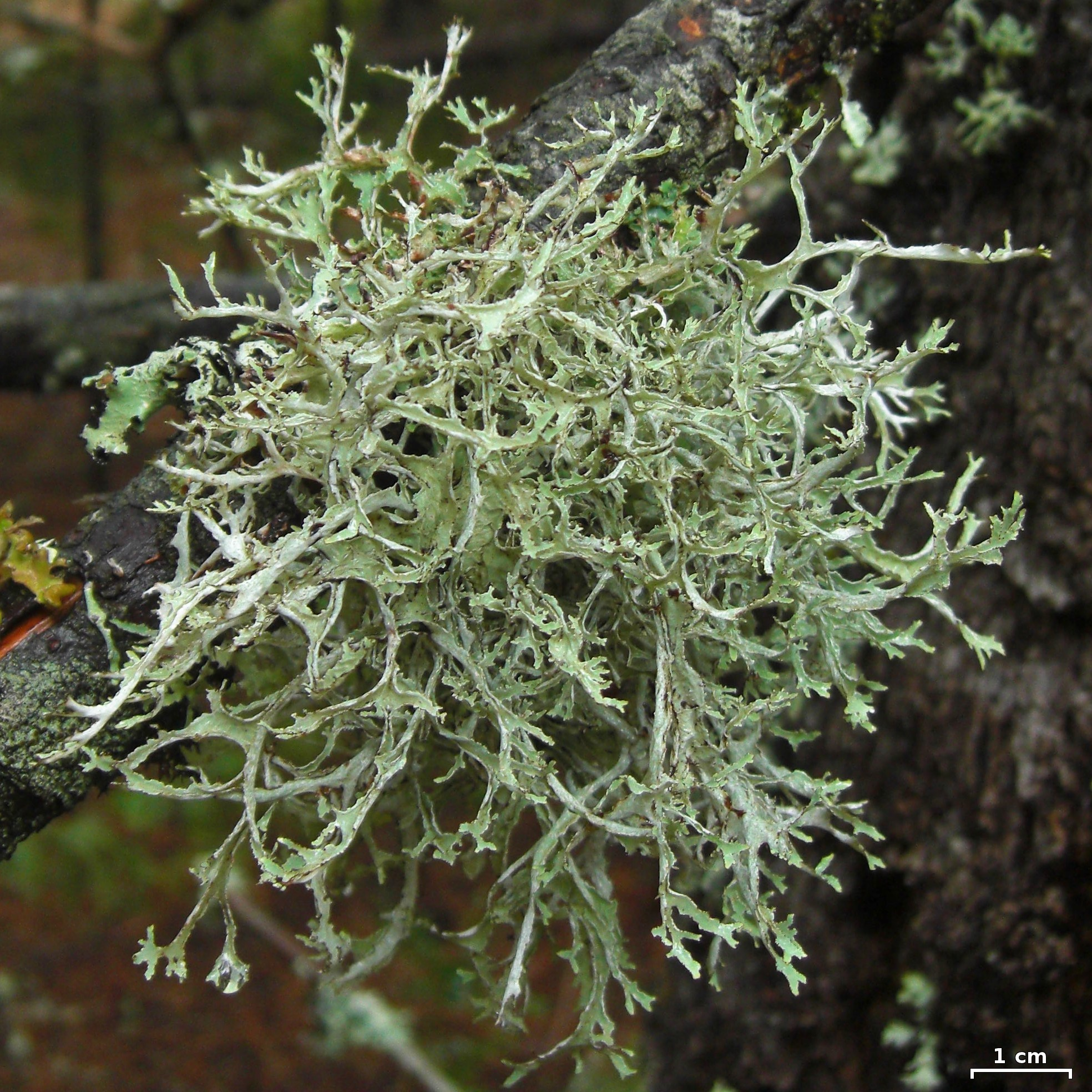

Conservation status
- Secure (NatureServe)

Scientific classification
- Kingdom: Fungi
- Division: Ascomycota
- Class: Lecanoromycetes
- Order: Lecanorales
- Family: Parmeliaceae
- Genus: Platismatia
- Species: P. stenophylla

Binomial name
- Platismatia stenophylla (Tuck.) W.L.Culb. & C.F.Culb. (1968)

Synonyms
- Cetraria lacunosa f. stenophylla Tuck. (1882); Cetraria lacunosa subsp. stenophylla (Tuck.) Herre (1910); Cetraria stenophylla (Tuck.) G.Merr. (1910); Platysma glaucum var. stenophyllum (Tuck.) R.Howe (1913)

= Platismatia stenophylla =

Species of lichen

Platismatia stenophylla is a species of corticolous (bark-dwelling), foliose lichen in the family Parmeliaceae. It is found in western North America, from Vancouver Island south to central California, usually close to a shore. The lichen is distinguished from others in its genus by its narrow, linear lobes and primarily sexual reproduction.

== Taxonomy ==
Platismatia stenophylla was first formally described as a species of Cetrelia in 1882 by American lichenologist Edward Tuckerman. William and Chicita Culberson transferred it to the genus Platismatia in 1968. Recent phylogenetic analysis suggests that P. stenophylla and P. herrei may be recently diverged species or possibly morphological variants of the same species. They were not recovered as reciprocally monophyletic in genetic studies, and the genetic distance between them was below that observed between other pairs of Platismatia species. Ancestral state reconstruction suggests that the clade composed of P. herrei (asexual) and P. stenophylla (sexual) likely had a sexual ancestor.

== Description ==
The upper thallus of P. stenophylla is whitish, tan, or pale brown, occasionally somewhat darkening. It has narrow, linear lobes with strongly incurved margins and a smooth upper surface. The lower surface is whitish, tan or brown, minutely reticulate rugose, sometimes veined at ridge crests, darkening but not punctate. It has few black rhizines, present only at places of attachment.

Platismatia stenophylla reproduces primarily through sexual means. Its apothecia (reproductive structures) are red-brown and shiny, broad, and may be perforate or not. The subhymenium is often underlain with algae.

Chemical analysis has revealed that P. stenophylla contains caperatic acid and atranorin as lichen products.

== Habitat and distribution ==
Platismatia stenophylla is found in western North America, from Vancouver Island south to central California, usually close to a shore. It has a largely sympatric range with P. herrei on the West Coast of North America, although P. stenophylla has a slightly smaller distribution.

Further research with increased sampling and additional genetic loci is needed to fully resolve the relationship between P. stenophylla and P. herrei and to better understand their distribution patterns.
