= Sarrameana =

Scientific classification
- Kingdom: Fungi
- Division: Ascomycota
- Class: Lecanoromycetes
- Order: Sarrameanales
- Family: Sarrameanaceae
- Genus: Sarrameana; Vězda & P.James (1973)

Type species
- Sarrameana paradoxa Vězda & P.James (1973)

Species
- S. albidoplumbea S. paradoxa

Genus of lichen-forming fungi

Sarrameana is a small genus of lichen-forming fungi in the family Sarrameanaceae. Established in 1973 from specimens collected in New Caledonia, this genus is distinguished by its unusual spores that have long, hair-like tails at both ends and often coil in spirals within the spore-containing structures. The genus contains two species of small, crust-forming lichens that grow on bark in cool, humid forests of the southern hemisphere, including New Caledonia, Tasmania, and New Zealand. Both species form a thin, white thallus with scattered black fruiting bodies.

== Taxonomy ==
Sarrameana was circumscribed in 1973 by the lichenologists Antonín Vězda and Peter James for material from New Caledonia with an unusual spore type; because the fungus did not fit any known lecideoid genera, they erected a new genus with Sarrameana paradoxa as the type species and, pending broader study, placed it only tentatively in the Lecideaceae in the loose sense. The type collection comes from the Sarraméa area (Col d'Amieu Forestry Station), which also was the inspiration for the genus name.

In Australasian treatments from the mid-2000s, Sarrameana paradoxa has been sunk into S. albidoplumbea on the grounds that the "tailed" ascospore tips used to separate the type are variable and not taxonomically reliable. However, this synonymy has not been universally adopted: major global nomenclators continue to maintain entries for both names as separate species. In their 1996 revision, Gintaras Kantvilas and Vězda also declined to conserve the younger name Sarrameana paradoxa, arguing that the older epithet albidoplumbea was already the more established usage in the lichen literature of Tasmania and New Zealand.

== Description ==
Sarrameana forms a very thin, white crust on bark that blends into the substrate rather than having a sharp edge. In cross-section, the thallus has two layers: a very thin, alga-free upper rind made of loosely arranged colourless fungal threads (hyphae), and a lower layer embedded among the outer bark cells that contains the partner green alga (small spherical cells consistent with Trebouxia). Routine spot tests for secondary metabolites (K, C, and Pd) are all negative.

The sexual fruiting bodies are scattered black discs (apothecia) of the lecideine type, meaning they have a dark, fungus-made rim rather than one built from the thallus. They are about 0.6–1.2 mm across, with a thick, glossy margin and a flat to slightly convex, matt disc. Inside, the side-wall (excipulum) is developed only at the sides and is built from simple, radiating hyphae packed with minute oil droplets. The spore-bearing layer (hymenium) is 60–75 μm tall and becomes olive-black at the top, while the sterile filaments between the spore sacs (paraphyses) are unbranched (simple) and slender (about 1.5 μm wide). Beneath the hymenium lies a 70–80 μm layer of tightly cemented vertical hyphae (subhymenium).

The spore sacs (asci) are cylindrical to club-shaped (clavate), each containing eight spores. They have relatively thick walls and an apical dome (tholus) that stains blue with iodine. A later reassessment of the genus highlighted a distinctive combination of features: this strongly iodine-reactive, hood-shaped ascus tip; mostly straight and only sparsely branched paraphyses that separate readily in potassium hydroxide (K); and thin-walled spores without a gelatinous sheath (halo) that are tightly coiled inside the ascus.

The spores are the genus's most diagnostic feature. Each ascospore is long, narrow, one-celled, and colourless, with both ends abruptly tapered into thread-like tails about 15–18 μm long; inside the ascus they are often coiled in a spiral. Including the tails, they typically measure 55–80 × 3–4 μm and have very thin walls. Asexual structures (pycnidia) are small, black, hemispherical, and sitting directly on the thallus surface (roughly 0.1 mm across). They produce simple, rod-shaped conidia measuring 6–7 × 0.5 μm with pointed ends.

== Species ==
- Sarrameana albidoplumbea (Hook.f. & Taylor) Farkas (1995)
- Sarrameana paradoxa Vězda & P.James (1973)

Three other taxa formerly classified in this genus have since been transferred to the genus Loxospora:

- Sarrameana cyamidia (Stirt.) Kantvilas & Vězda (1996) is now Loxospora cyamidia
- Sarrameana septata Sipman & Aptroot (1991) is now Loxospora septata
- Sarrameana tasmanica Vězda & Kantvilas (1988) is now considered synonymous with Loxospora solenospora
