= Sarrameana paradoxa =

Scientific classification
- Kingdom: Fungi
- Division: Ascomycota
- Class: Lecanoromycetes
- Order: Sarrameanales
- Family: Sarrameanaceae
- Genus: Sarrameana
- Species: S. paradoxa

Binomial name
- Sarrameana paradoxa Vězda & P.James (1973)

Species of lichen-forming fungus

Sarrameana paradoxa is a species of corticolous (bark-dwelling) lichen in the family Sarrameanaceae, and is the type species of the genus Sarrameana, a small group of corticolous lichens from cool-temperate forests of the southern hemisphere. The species forms a thin white film on bark and produces abundant black disc-like fruiting bodies with glossy margins. It is characterised by unusually long, narrow ascospores that taper at each end into hair-like tails and are often coiled inside the spore sacs. Originally described from New Caledonia, the species is now considered by some authorities to be the same as the earlier-named Sarrameana albidoplumbea from New Zealand, though this treatment remains disputed.

== Taxonomy ==
Sarrameana paradoxa is the type (and in the original account the only) species of the genus Sarrameana, erected by Antonín Vězda and Peter James in 1973 for an unusual corticolous (bark-dwelling) lichen from New Caledonia. The authors set up the new genus because the fungus has distinctive, very long, single-celled ascospores whose ends taper into hair-like tails; taken together with apothecial anatomy and development, these features did not fit any known genus of apothecial disc-forming lichens. Although the thallus with black apothecia can mimic members of the Lecidea/Lecidella complex, the micro-characters are different. Because the apothecia are lecideine (black-rimmed discs without a thalline margin), Vězda and James tentatively placed the genus in a broad Lecideaceae (in the loose sense, or sensu lato), while noting that its apothecial ontogeny differs from "typical" lecideoid taxa. The type locality is Sarraméa, Col d'Amieu Forestry Station, New Caledonia (elevation 1,500 ft), where D. J. Hill collected the type specimen on thin bark of Araucaria cookii on 16 March 1966 (specimen no. 11866); the holotype is housed in the herbarium of the British Museum (BM).

Later authors have linked Sarrameana paradoxa with the earlier New Zealand lichen Lecidea albidoplumbea J.D.Hook. & Taylor, subsequently treated as Bacidia albidoplumbea and recombined in Sarrameana as Sarrameana albidoplumbea by Edit Farkas. In their revision of the genus, Gintaras Kantvilas and Vězda compared extensive material from Tasmania, Victoria, New Zealand and New Caledonia and concluded that the type collection of S. paradoxa falls within the variation of S. albidoplumbea, including the variable development of the needle-like projections at the ascospore tips. They therefore treated S. paradoxa as a later synonym of S. albidoplumbea and preferred the epithet albidoplumbea, which is widely used in Tasmanian and New Zealand floras, over the little-used name paradoxa. This proposed synonymy has not been universally adopted: major global nomenclators continue to maintain entries for both names as separate species.

Kantvilas and Vězda interpreted Sarrameana as a small genus of four corticolous species in their 1996 treatment, all from cool-temperate forests in the southern hemisphere, and placed it in the monogeneric family Sarrameanaceae within the Lecanorales. They distinguished the genus from superficially similar bacidioid and lecideoid genera by its deeply amyloid, hood-shaped ascus apex, simple paraphyses that separate readily in potassium hydroxide (KOH) solution, and its thin-walled, spiralled ascospores.

== Description ==
The thallus (lichen body) forms a thin, continuous white film on bark; spot tests K, Pd and C are negative. In section it is two-layered: an upper, roughly 10 μm epiphloeodal cortex of interwoven hyphae without algae (air spaces make thin sections look opaque), and a lower, to about 20 μm hypophloeodal algal zone with small green, mostly spherical algal cells (about 6–10 μm; likely Trebouxia) packed into the host periderm.

Apothecia (disc-like fruiting bodies) are abundant, lecideine in form, 0.6–1.2 mm across and 0.15–0.3 mm tall, deep black with a thick, glossy margin. The disc is matt, flat to slightly convex, and the base is strongly constricted. The excipulum (rim tissue) is laterally developed, 100–120 μm thick, hyaline inside but with a thin violet-black outer zone; it is densely impregnated with oil droplets. The hymenium (spore-bearing layer) is 60–75 μm tall, with a dark-olive epihymenium and many oil droplets. Paraphyses (sterile filaments among the spore sacs) are simple, straight and about 1.5 μm wide, and are built like the hyphae of the excipulum. The subhymenium beneath is 70–80 μm tall, made of vertical, closely glued hyphae. In iodine (Lugol's), young asci (spore sacs) stain deep blue; in older apothecia the amyloid reaction diffuses so the whole hymenium turns blue. Asci are 65–70 × 15–18 μm with an apical tholus to about 8 μm. The eight spores per ascus are hyaline, one-celled, long and narrow (55–80 × 3–4 μm), and each end narrows further into a filamentous tail about 15–18 μm long; in the ascus they are often spirally coiled. Pycnidia (minute asexual structures) are small, black, hemispherical (about 0.1 mm); conidia are simple, rod-shaped, 6–7 × 0.5 μm with acute tips.

== Habitat and distribution ==
In the original material the lichen grew on thin branchlets (about 1.5 cm diameter) of cultivated Araucaria cookii at Sarraméa (Col d'Amieu Forestry Station), New Caledonia, at roughly 1,500 ft. The species is corticolous and, at the time of description, was known only from this locality.
