= Loxospora isidiata =

Scientific classification
- Domain: Eukaryota
- Kingdom: Fungi
- Division: Ascomycota
- Class: Lecanoromycetes
- Order: Sarrameanales
- Family: Sarrameanaceae
- Genus: Loxospora
- Species: L. isidiata

Binomial name
- Loxospora isidiata Kalb (1992)

Species of lichen

Loxospora isidiata is a species of corticolous (bark-dwelling), crustose lichen in the family Sarrameanaceae. Found in the Philippines, it was formally described as a new species in 1992 by lichenologist Klaus Kalb. It is similar in morphology to Loxospora ochrophaeae, but differs by having a thallus with papilliform (nipple-shaped) isidia, measuring 0.1 by 0.3 mm; the species epithet refers to this prominent feature. The type specimen was collected by the author in 1983 from Benguet (Northern Luzon) at an altitude of 2,000 m (6,600 ft), where it was found growing on a pine tree.
