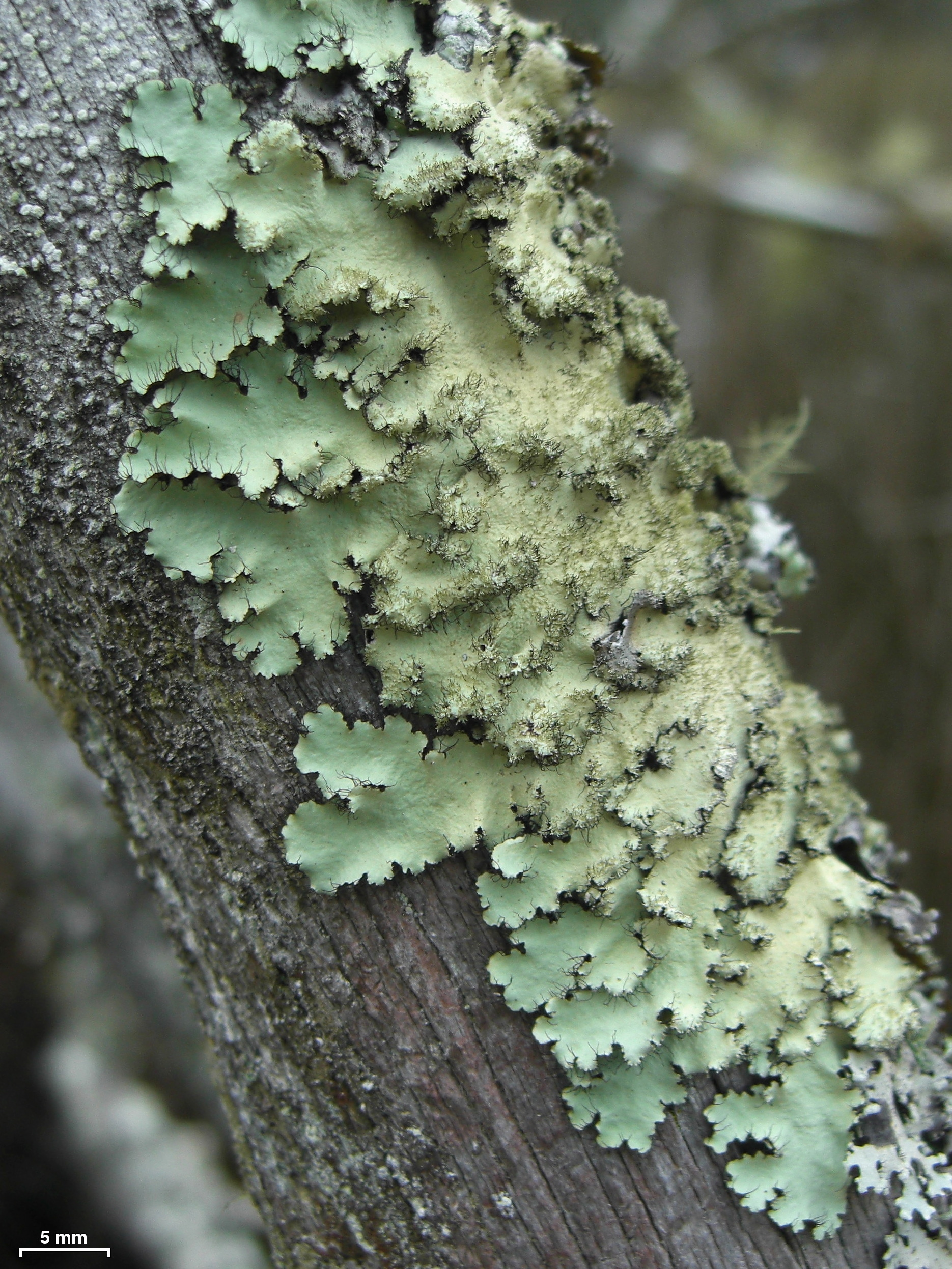

Conservation status
- Apparently Secure (NatureServe)

Scientific classification
- Kingdom: Fungi
- Division: Ascomycota
- Class: Lecanoromycetes
- Order: Lecanorales
- Family: Parmeliaceae
- Genus: Parmotrema
- Species: P. xanthinum

Binomial name
- Parmotrema xanthinum (Müll.Arg.) Hale (1974)

Synonyms
- List: Parmelia proboscidea var. xanthina Müll.Arg. (1884); Parmelia perlata var. xanthina (Müll.Arg.) Stizenb. (1890); Parmelia xanthina (Müll.Arg.) Vain. (1890); Parmelia xanthina f. isidiosa Müll.Arg. (1891)

= Parmotrema xanthinum =

Species of lichen

Parmotrema xanthinum is a species of corticolous (bark-dwelling), foliose lichen in the family Parmeliaceae. It has a pale yellowish to greenish-grey body (thallus) that attaches loosely to its bark surface. First described in 1884, it was the subject of recent taxonomic studies that showed it to be the same species as the previously distinct Parmotrema madagascariaceum. The lichen can be identified by its broad lobes, 10–20 cm (4–8 in) across, with small finger-like projections (isidia) on its surface and hair-like projections (cilia) along its edges. While particularly common in southeastern North America, including coastal and mountainous regions, it is widely distributed in subtropical and temperate areas worldwide. The species can be chemically distinguished by the presence of specific secondary metabolites including usnic acid and protolichinestrinic acid in its tissues.

== Taxonomy ==
The lichen was first named and scientifically described by the Swiss lichenologist Johannes Müller Argoviensis, who called it Parmelia proboscidea var. xanthina. It gained full status as a species in Mason Hale's 1974 circumscription of the genus Parmotrema.

Parmotrema xanthinum has historically been distinguished from its close relative Parmotrema madagascariaceum primarily based on differences in chemotaxonomy. Both species are characterised by the presence of ciliate margins, isidia all over the thallus surface (i.e., laminal), and the production of usnic acid in the cortex, along with fatty acids of the protolichenisterinic acid group in the medulla. The main differentiator has been the presence of gyrophoric acid in P. madagascariaceum. More recent studies incorporating biogeography, chemistry, morphology, and molecular phylogenetics have led to the treatment of these two taxa as conspecific, meaning they are now considered the same species.

Molecular phylogenetics analyses of nuclear ribosomal internal transcribed spacer sequence data do not differentiate Parmotrema madagascariaceum and P. xanthinum as separate entities. The sequence divergence observed is typical of variation within a single lichen species, further supporting the conspecific treatment of these taxa.

== Description ==
This species typically features large, broad-lobed thalli with laminal isidia, often accompanied by apical cilia. The presence of marginal cilia varies from nearly absent to abundant but does not correlate with the presence or absence of gyrophoric acid. The thallus is foliose, generally 10–20 cm (4–8 in) in diameter, and ranges from adnate to loosely adnate. Lobes are irregularly branched and overlapping, with a yellow-green upper surface that may have white laminal maculae (spotting) and reticulate cracks. The medulla is white, and the lower surface is black with a light to dark brown marginal zone.

=== Chemistry ===
Parmotrema xanthinum has two chemotypes. Chemotype I consists of usnic acid, protolichinestrinic acid aggregate, and gyrophoric acid, with varying spot test reactions possibly due to different concentrations of gyrophoric acid. Chemotype II includes usnic acid and protolichinestrinic acid aggregate, with consistent negative spot test reactions.

== Distribution ==
Parmotrema xanthinum has a broad geographic distribution. While Lendemer's 2016 study highlighted its presence in the subtropical and temperate regions of southeastern North America, including the Coastal plain, Piedmont, southern Appalachian Mountains, and Ozark Highlands, this species is also found in other parts of the world. It is known from various subtropical and tropical regions globally, including Madagascar. This widespread distribution is typical for many species within the genus Parmotrema, which are found in diverse habitats across different continents.

== See also ==
- List of Parmotrema species
