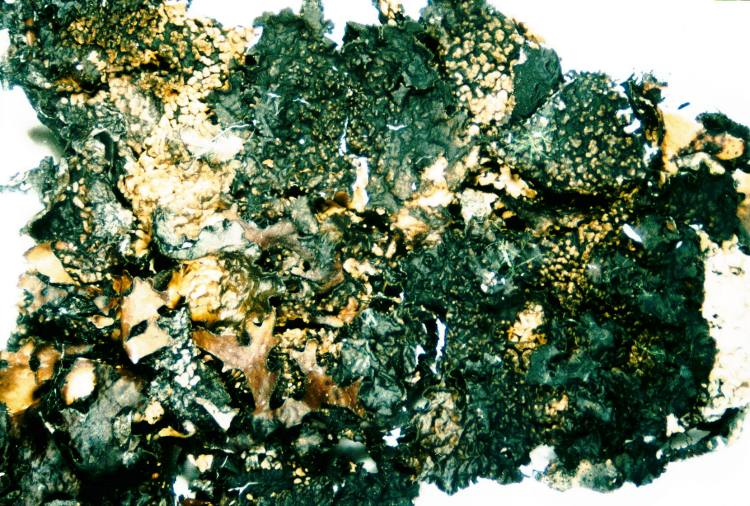
- Asahinea scholanderi

Scientific classification
- Kingdom: Fungi
- Division: Ascomycota
- Class: Lecanoromycetes
- Order: Lecanorales
- Family: Parmeliaceae
- Genus: Asahinea; W.L.Culb. & C.F.Culb. (1965)

Type species
- Asahinea chrysantha (Tuck.) W.L.Culb. & C.F.Culb. (1965)

Species
- A. chrysantha A. culbersoniorum A. kurodakensis A. scholanderi

= Asahinea =

Genus of lichen-forming fungi

Asahinea is a genus of lichen-forming fungi in the family Parmeliaceae. The genus has a widespread circumpolar distribution, and contains four species. The species form medium to large, leaf-like, yellowish to brownish crusts on rocks and plant debris in open arctic and alpine habitats, and can be conspicuous in the field; A. chrysantha in particular produces bright yellow rosettes that stand out against the tundra. The genus is named in honour of the Japanese lichenologist Yasuhiko Asahina, who made foundational contributions to the understanding of lichen chemistry in the twentieth century.

== Taxonomy ==
Asahinea was established as a genus of lichen-forming fungi in the family Parmeliaceae by the husband and wife lichenologist team William and Chicita F. Culberson in 1965. Their work arose from a re-examination of species traditionally placed in the broad circumscription of Cetraria used by Alexander Zahlbruckner. In their survey, they identified several natural groups distinguished by cortex structure and chemical composition. One of these groups, comprising three species with a prosoplectenchymatous cortex but lacking rhizines, was judged sufficiently distinct to warrant recognition as a separate genus. The Culbersons named it Asahinea in honour of the Japanese lichenologist Yasuhiko Asahina, whose pioneering studies in lichen chemistry had helped reshape the field.

The type species of the genus is Asahinea chrysantha, first described by Edward Tuckerman in 1858 as Cetraria chrysantha. Along with this species, two others were transferred to the genus: A. scholanderi, originally described by George Llano in 1951, and A. kurodakensis, described by Asahina in 1953. These species are united by their similar thallus structure, the absence of rhizines, and their shared production of lichen products such as atranorin and alectoronic acid.

== Description ==
Asahinea species form medium- to large-sized, leaf-like thalli, typically about 3–27 cm across. The upper surface ranges from clear yellow through yellow-tan to brownish, and may be mottled or edged in black; the margin lacks cilia. Two surface states occur: either the lobes bear scattered pseudocyphellae (minute pores that look like tiny breaks in the cortex) and lack isidia, or they are isidiate (with short, peg-like propagules) and lack pseudocyphellae. The underside is jet-black with a narrow brown rim and, importantly, has no rhizines (root-like holdfasts). Apothecia (fruiting bodies) are uncommon. When present they sit at or away from the margin and have an imperforate disc. Pycnidia are also rare. Asci contain eight simple (one-celled) ascospores, about 8–13 × 5–8 μm.

In section, the upper cortex is prosoplectenchymatous (a dense, non-cellular-looking layer of tightly agglutinated hyphae) about 16–26 μm thick; the medulla is 65–248 μm thick and usually white, sometimes taking on lavender-to-purple tints in ageing parts near the lower cortex. The lower cortex is similarly 16–26 μm and black. Standard spot tests on the medulla are K− and C−, with K then C giving a pink-to-red reaction (KC+), and PD−. The chemistry is consistent across the genus: the upper cortex contains atranorin, and in one species (the type, A. chrysantha) also usnic acid, while the medulla contains alectoronic acid together with α-collatolic acid (some plants of one species have alectoronic acid alone).

== Habitat and distribution ==
Asahinea is an arctic–montane genus. The species are characteristic of open, cold-country habitats, especially tundra, where they grow on boulders and plant debris. Some populations also occur in high mountain belts at lower latitudes. In the field they can be conspicuous when fresh; A. chrysantha, in particular, forms bright yellow rosettes that stand out against tundra substrates, though apothecia are uncommon.

Within the genus, A. chrysantha is circumpolar in the Arctic from the Ural Mountains across Siberia to the Bering Strait, and in North America from the Aleutians and most of Alaska into adjacent Yukon and southern Baffin Island; it also reappears in the high mountains of Japan. A. scholanderi occupies a broadly overlapping arctic range from Siberia to northern and central Alaska, likewise on tundra boulders and plant remains. In contrast, A. kurodakensis is a Japanese endemic restricted to the high mountains of Hokkaido and Honshu and is apparently rare, being known from only a few localities.

== Species ==
- Asahinea chrysantha (Tuck.) W.L.Culb. & C.F.Culb. (1965)
- Asahinea culbersoniorum Trass (1992)
- Asahinea kurodakensis (Asahina) W.L.Culb. & C.F.Culb. (1965)
- Asahinea scholanderi (Llano) W.L.Culb. & C.F.Culb. (1965)
