= Loxospora septata =

Scientific classification
- Domain: Eukaryota
- Kingdom: Fungi
- Division: Ascomycota
- Class: Lecanoromycetes
- Order: Sarrameanales
- Family: Sarrameanaceae
- Genus: Loxospora
- Species: L. septata

Binomial name
- Loxospora septata (Sipman & Aptroot) Kantvilas (2000)

Synonyms
- Sarrameana septata Sipman & Aptroot (1991)

Species of lichen

Loxospora septata is a species of crustose lichen in the family Sarrameanaceae. It was first formally described as a new species in 1991 by Harrie Sipman and André Aptroot as Sarrameana septata The type was collected in Mt. Gahavisuki Provincial Park, in the Eastern Highlands Province of Papua New Guinea. Here it was found growing on bark at an altitude of 2,300 m (7,500 ft). Gintaras Kantvilas transferred the taxon to Loxospora in 2000, as he thought several characteristics of the lichen made it a better fit for this genus. These include: the presence of thamnolic acid in the thallus, the structure of the apothecia, the sparse branching of the paraphyses, and the absence of oil droplets in the hymenium.
