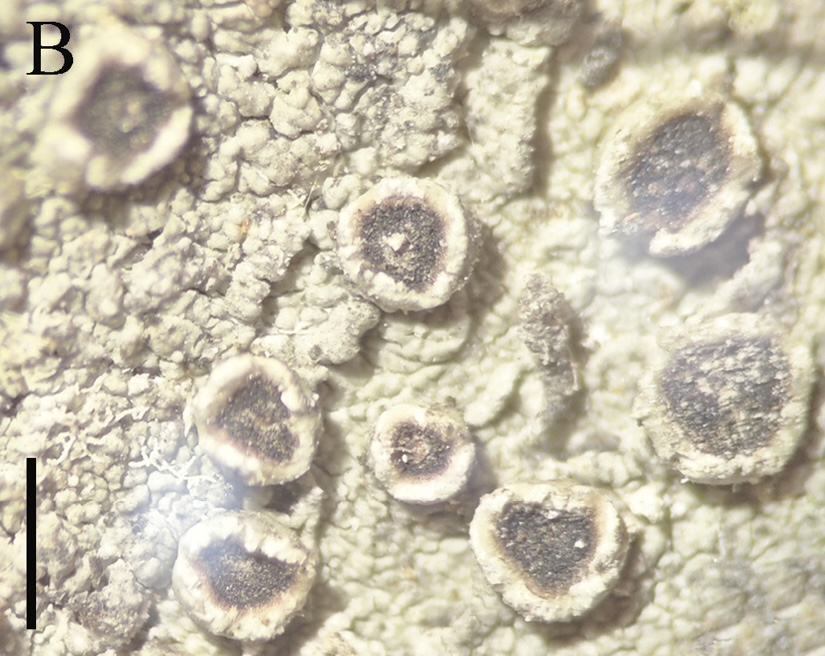
- Chicitaea yueliangshanensis; scale: 1 mm

Scientific classification
- Kingdom: Fungi
- Division: Ascomycota
- Class: Lecanoromycetes
- Order: Sarrameanales
- Family: Sarrameanaceae
- Genus: Chicitaea; Guzow-Krzem., Kukwa & Lendemer (2024)

Type species
- Chicitaea lecanoriformis (Lumbsch, A.W.Archer & Elix) Guzow-Krzem., Kukwa & Lendemer (2024)

Species
- C. assateaguensis C. confusa C. cristinae C. lecanoriformis C. yueliangshanensis

= Chicitaea =

Genus of lichen-forming fungi

Chicitaea is a genus of lichen-forming fungi in the family Sarrameanaceae. Established in 2024, it comprises five species that grow as crusts on tree bark in forests across North America, Europe, Australia, China, and Thailand. The genus was separated from Loxospora based on molecular evidence and chemical differences, particularly the presence of 2'-O-methylperlatolic acid as the main secondary compound. The lichens appear in shades from pale grey-green to olive-grey and can reproduce through both vegetative structures (soredia or isidia) and, in one species, through sexual spore-producing structures (apothecia).

== Taxonomy ==
Chicitaea was established as a genus in 2024 by Beata Guzow-Krzemińska, Martin Kukwa, and James Lendemer to accommodate several species previously classified within Loxospora. The genus name honors Chicita F. Culberson (1931–2023), a pioneering American lichenologist known for establishing standardized protocols in lichen chemistry.

The type species is Chicitaea lecanoriformis, originally described from Australia. Molecular phylogenetics analyses revealed that species containing 2'-O-methylperlatolic acid formed a distinct monophyletic group separate from Loxospora in the strict sense. This chemical difference, combined with distinct morphological features of the reproductive structures, supported recognition at the genus level. Four species were transferred from Loxospora to the new genus. The genus is classified in the family Sarrameanaceae within the order Sarrameanales of the class Lecanoromycetes.

== Description ==
Chicitaea species are crustose lichens, meaning they grow as a tight crust that adheres closely to their substrate, typically tree bark. The thallus (main body of the lichen) can range from thin to thick and appears in shades from pale grey-green to olive-grey, with a surface that varies from smooth to warty or bumpy. These lichens reproduce in different ways depending on the species. Some produce small powdery structures called soredia, while others develop small cylindrical outgrowths called isidia. Both these structures contain both fungal and algal cells, allowing the lichen to reproduce as a unit. Sexual reproduction through disc-like structures (apothecia) is known in two species, C. lecanoriformis and C. yueliangshanensis. When present, these apothecia are up to 1.5 mm wide, sitting directly on the thallus surface, and are concave with dark reddish-brown to black centers.

The main identifying chemical component found in all Chicitaea species is 2'-O-methylperlatolic acid, which helps distinguish them from similar-looking lichens. This compound can be detected through simple chemical tests, in which the lichen shows no color change when potassium hydroxide solution (K) is applied, and appears white under ultraviolet light (UV). The central portion of the lichen tissue, the medulla, shows the same reactions.

In C. lecanoriformis, which produces spores through sexual reproduction, the spores are simple (not divided into compartments), broadly ellipsoid in shape, and either straight or slightly curved. Each spore-producing cell (ascus) contains 6–8 spores and lacks the blue-staining dome at its tip (a tholus) that is characteristic of some related genera when stained with iodine.

== Habitat and distribution ==
Chicitaea species grow primarily on tree bark (corticolous) in various forest habitats. The genus shows a disjunct global distribution pattern across several continents. C. assateaguensis is known from eastern United States, particularly the Mid-Atlantic coastal region, while C. confusa occurs in North America and is currently only documented from the United States. C. cristinae has been found in Europe, with records from Poland and Germany. C. lecanoriformis shows a southern distribution, known only from Australia and Thailand. C. yueliangshanensis is known from Guizhou Province, China, where it was collected on bark in the Yueliangshan Nature Reserve at 959 m elevation.

The geographic separation between the northern hemisphere species (C. assateaguensis, C. confusa, and C. cristinae) and the southern hemisphere species (C. lecanoriformis) is particularly notable.C. yueliangshanensis C. lecanoriformis and C. yueliangshanensis are also the only consistently fertile species in the genus, while the others primarily reproduce through vegetative means.

== Species ==
- Chicitaea assateaguensis (Lendemer) Guzow-Krzem., Kukwa & Lendemer (2024)
- Chicitaea confusa (Lendemer) Guzow-Krzem., Kukwa & Lendemer (2024)
- Chicitaea cristinae (Guzow-Krzem., Łubek, Kubiak & Kukwa) Guzow-Krzem., Kukwa & Lendemer (2024)
- Chicitaea lecanoriformis (Lumbsch, A.W.Archer & Elix) Guzow-Krzem., Kukwa & Lendemer (2024)
- Chicitaea yueliangshanensis Wei Wu & S.B.Fu (2026) – China
