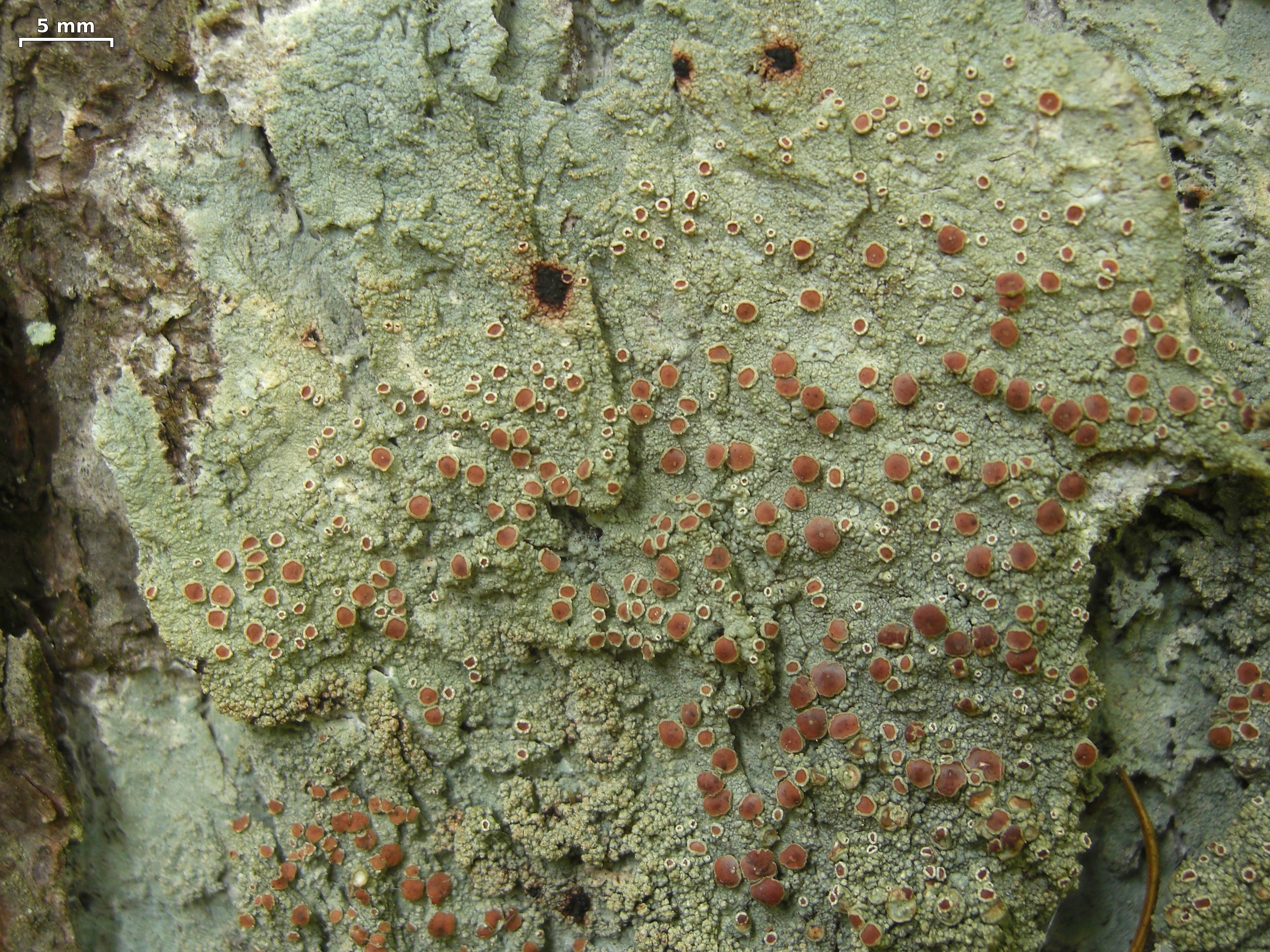

Conservation status
- Apparently Secure (NatureServe)

Scientific classification
- Kingdom: Fungi
- Division: Ascomycota
- Class: Lecanoromycetes
- Order: Sarrameanales
- Family: Sarrameanaceae
- Genus: Loxospora
- Species: L. ochrophaea

Binomial name
- Loxospora ochrophaea (Tuck.) R.C.Harris (1990)

Synonyms
- Biatora ochrophaea Tuck. (1848); Lecanora ochrophaea (Tuck.) Nyl. (1857); Haematomma ochrophaeum (Tuck.) A.Massal. (1860); Lecanora elatina f. ochrophaea (Tuck.) Tuck. (1882); Lecanora elatina var. ochrophaea (Tuck.) Tuck. (1882); Lecania ochrophaea (Tuck.) Müll.Arg. (1891); Haematomma elatinum var. ochrophaeum (Tuck.) G.Merr. & Burnham (1922)

= Loxospora ochrophaea =

Species of lichen

Loxospora ochrophaea is a species of crustose lichen in the family Sarrameanaceae.

== Taxonomy ==
It was first described scientifically by American lichenologist Edward Tuckerman in 1848 as Biatora ochrophaea. It has been shuffled to various genera in its taxonomic history, including Lecanora, Haematomma, and Lecania. Richard Harris proposed a transfer to Loxospora in 1990.

== Description ==
Loxospora ochrophaea has a crust-like thallus that is light gray to green with a warty texture. It has peach-coloured apothecia that have a white margin. The lichen contains thamnolic acid and zeorin as secondary compounds. Found in North America, it grows on bark.
