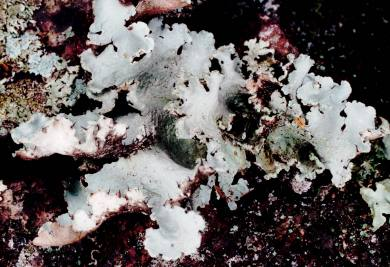
- Parmotrema hypotropum

Scientific classification
- Kingdom: Fungi
- Division: Ascomycota
- Class: Lecanoromycetes
- Order: Lecanorales
- Family: Parmeliaceae
- Genus: Parmotrema; A.Massal. (1860)

Type species
- Parmotrema perforatum (Wulfen) A.Massal. (1860)

Synonyms
- Canomaculina Elix & Hale (1987); Concamerella W.L.Culb. & C.F.Culb. (1981); Parmelaria D.D.Awasthi (1987); Rimelia Hale & A.Fletcher (1990); Rimeliella Kurok. (1991)

= Parmotrema =

Genus of fungi

Parmotrema is a genus of lichen belonging to the family Parmeliaceae. It is a large genus, containing an estimated 300 species, with a centre of diversity in subtropical regions of South America and the Pacific Islands.

Members of the genus are commonly called ruffle lichens or scatter-rag lichens.

== Description ==
Parmotrema is characterized by its typically large, moderately to loosely-attached foliose thallus with broad lobes that are usually more than 5 mm wide. There is a broad, naked zone around the margin of the lower surface, an epicortex with pores and an upper cortex with a palisade-plectenchymatous arrangement of hyphae. Ascospores are thick-walled and ellipsoid.

== Taxonomy ==
Parmotrema was proposed as a genus by Italian lichenologist Abramo Bartolommeo Massalongo in 1860, with Parmotrema perforatum as the type species. The genus name, composed of the Greek parmos (cup) and trema (perforation), refers to the perforate apothecia. Parmotrema was largely ignored as a genus, and its species were usually grouped in section Amphigymnia of the large genus Parmelia. Several genera previously segregated from Parmotrema have since been folded back in owing to molecular phylogenetic evidence, including Canomaculina, Concamerella, Parmelaria, and Rimelia.

== Uses ==
Some species of Parmotrema can be used as a vegetable dye, such as P. crinitum. When mixed with pine sap or with water, or when first burnt to ash, lichens can provide a variety of colors such as yellow, brown, green, orange, purple, and red. Some Parmotrema species also enter commerce as part of the lichen mixture known as "black stone flower", which is sold for culinary use under several regional names. Continued large-scale harvesting of commercially traded lichens may add to extinction risk when combined with habitat loss and climate change.

== Gallery ==
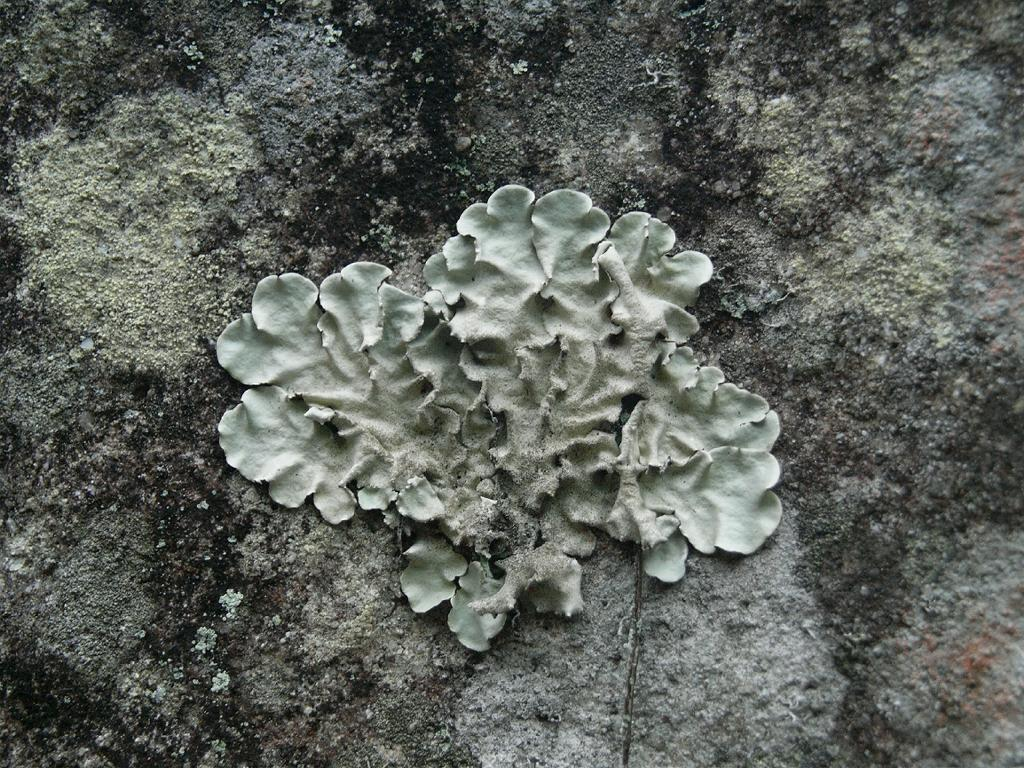
Parmotrema tinctorum

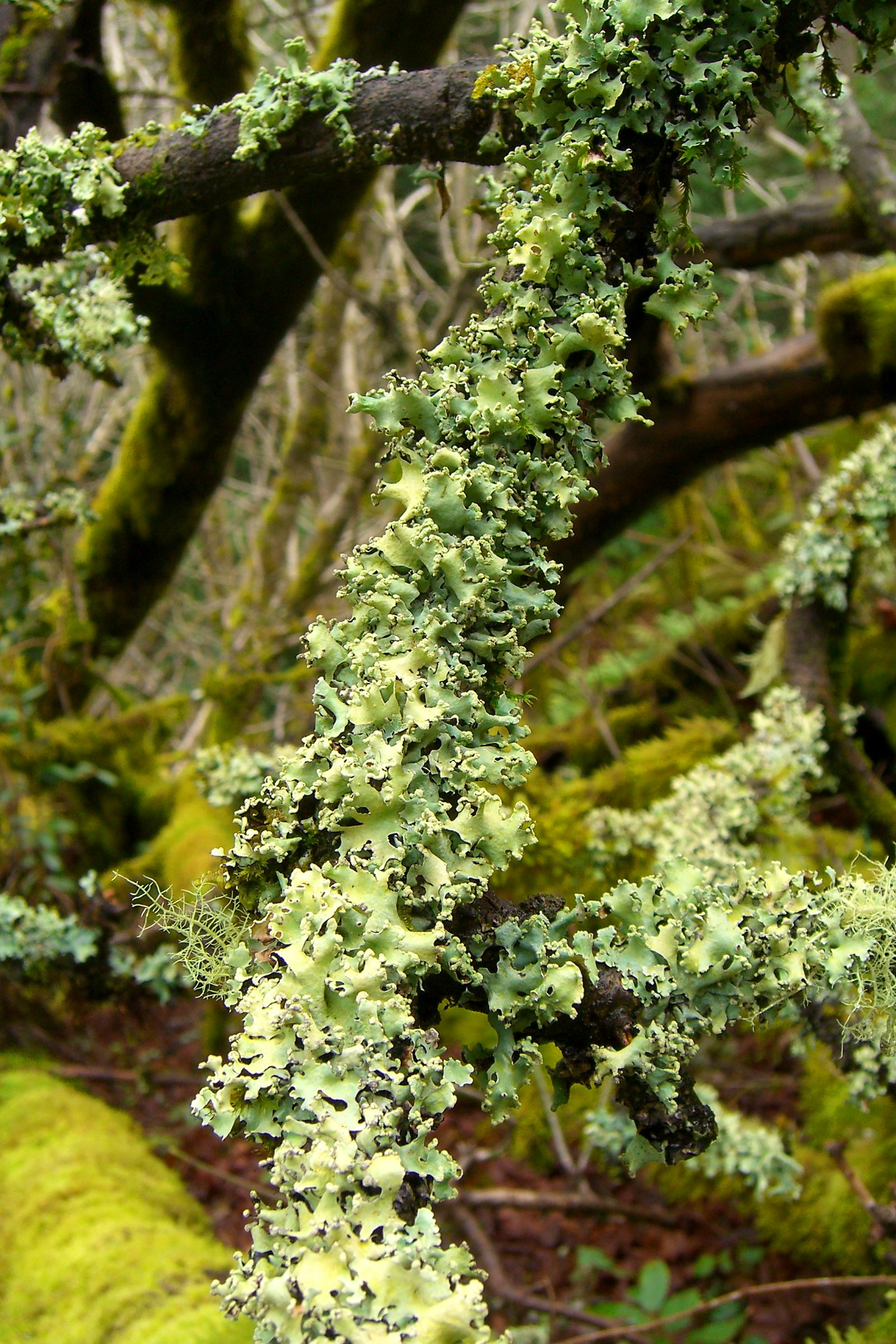
Parmotrema chinense

== See also ==
- List of Parmotrema species
