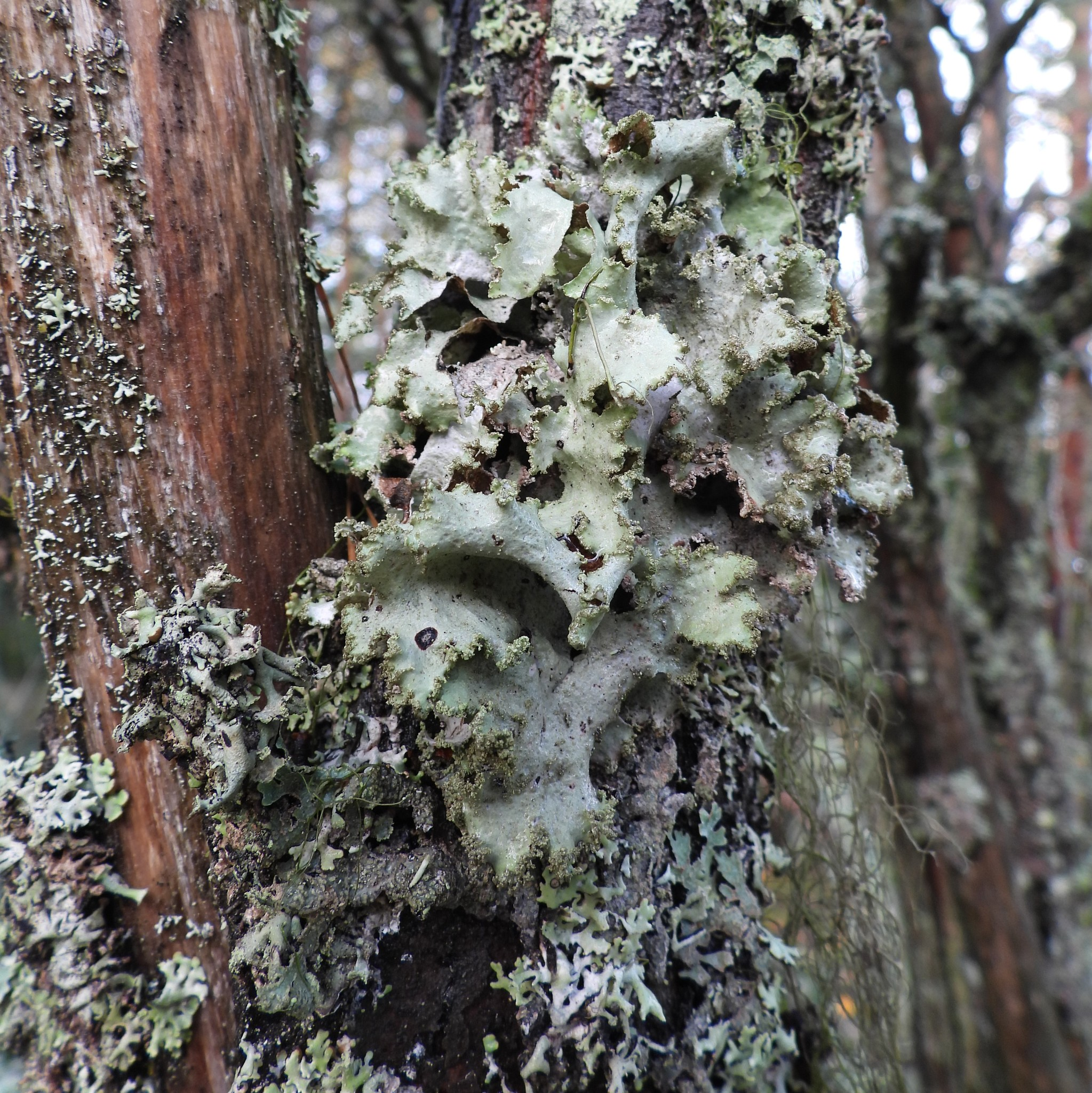

Conservation status
- Secure (NatureServe)

Scientific classification
- Kingdom: Fungi
- Division: Ascomycota
- Class: Lecanoromycetes
- Order: Lecanorales
- Family: Parmeliaceae
- Genus: Platismatia
- Species: P. glauca

Binomial name
- Platismatia glauca (L.) W.L.Culb. & C.F.Culb. (1968)

Synonyms
- Lichen glaucus L. (1753)

= Platismatia glauca =

Species of lichen-forming fungus

Platismatia glauca is a common and widespread species of corticolous (bark-dwelling), foliose lichen in the family Parmeliaceae. This distinctive lichen forms pale to dull grey patches measuring 1–15 centimetres across, with wavy, irregularly indented lobes that often have reproductive structures (apothecia) along their upturned margins. The species is known for its adaptability to varying nitrogen levels in the environment and contains several unique secondary metabolites that have been subjects of scientific research. In 2024, scientists completed a high-quality genome sequence of P. glauca as part of the Darwin Tree of Life Project, providing valuable resources for future studies of this widely distributed lichen that can be found throughout Africa, Asia, Europe, and North America.

== Taxonomy ==
It was first formally described by Carl Linnaeus in his 1753 work Species Plantarum. William and Chicita Culberson transferred it to the genus Platismatia in 1968.

A high-quality, chromosomally complete genome sequence has recently been assembled for Platismatia glauca as part of the Darwin Tree of Life Project, which aims to sequence all named eukaryotic species in Britain and Ireland. The genome, sequenced from a specimen collected at Benmore Botanic Garden in Scotland, spans 33.2 megabases and is scaffolded into 21 chromosomal pseudomolecules, with an additional complete mitochondrial genome. The assembly achieved high completeness and accuracy. While this represents a single haplotype, an alternate assembly was also deposited, reflecting the high heterozygosity of the sample. This genomic resource not only strengthens the taxonomic foundation of P. glauca but also supports future studies into its phenotypic variability, symbiotic complexity, and biochemical diversity.

== Description ==
Platismatia glauca is a foliose lichen species that typically forms extensive patches measuring 1–6 cm in diameter, though specimens can occasionally reach up to 15 cm. The thallus (the main body of the lichen) is relatively thin, with lobes extending to 1.5 cm in width. These lobes are characterised by their wavy, irregularly indented appearance with ascending margins that may be entire (smooth-edged) or sub-lobulate (slightly lobed).

The margins often feature distinctive clusters of reproductive structures that can appear as simple to coralloid (coral-like), much-branched isidia (small vegetative propagules) or partially as granular soredia (powdery propagative structures). The upper surface of the lichen is typically pale to dull grey, frequently showing a brownish tinge—or becoming entirely brown in locations exposed to high light levels. This colouration remains unchanged when wet. The surface texture ranges from smooth to wrinkled or slightly ridged, and lacks pseudocyphellae (small pores in the upper cortex).

The lower surface is predominantly black, though it may appear brown or white in shaded conditions, especially towards the margins. This underside features varying numbers of scattered rhizine (root-like structures that attach the lichen to its substrate), which may be unbranched or branched.

Fruiting bodies (apothecia) are extremely rare in this species, measuring 5–9 mm in diameter when present, and typically occur along the margins. These apothecia have a reddish-brown disc with a thin thalline margin that tends to become less distinct as the apothecium matures. The ascospores (sexual spores) measure 3.5–8.5 by 3–5 μm. Chemical spot testing shows that the cortex is K+ (yellow) due to the presence of atranorin. The medulla (inner layer) is C−, potassium hydroxide K−, KC−, Pd−, and does not fluoresce under ultraviolet light (UV−). The main medullary substance is caperatic acid.

== Research ==
Platismatia glauca can acclimate to large variations in the availability of environmental nitrogen. It efficiently assimilates increased nitrogen into its thallus, increasing the size as well as the photosynthetic capabilities of its photobiont.

== Chemistry ==
Several secondary metabolites (lichen products) have been isolated from the species, including the nor-triterpene ketone, 30-nor-21α-hopan-22-one, the depsides atranorin and chloroatranorin, and the aromatic compounds methyl β-orcinolcarboxylate and chloroatranol. Other compounds in the lichen are salazinic acid, β-orcinol carboxylic acid, 3-hydroxyphysodalic acid, physodalic acid, and physodic acid.

== See also ==
- List of lichens named by Carl Linnaeus
