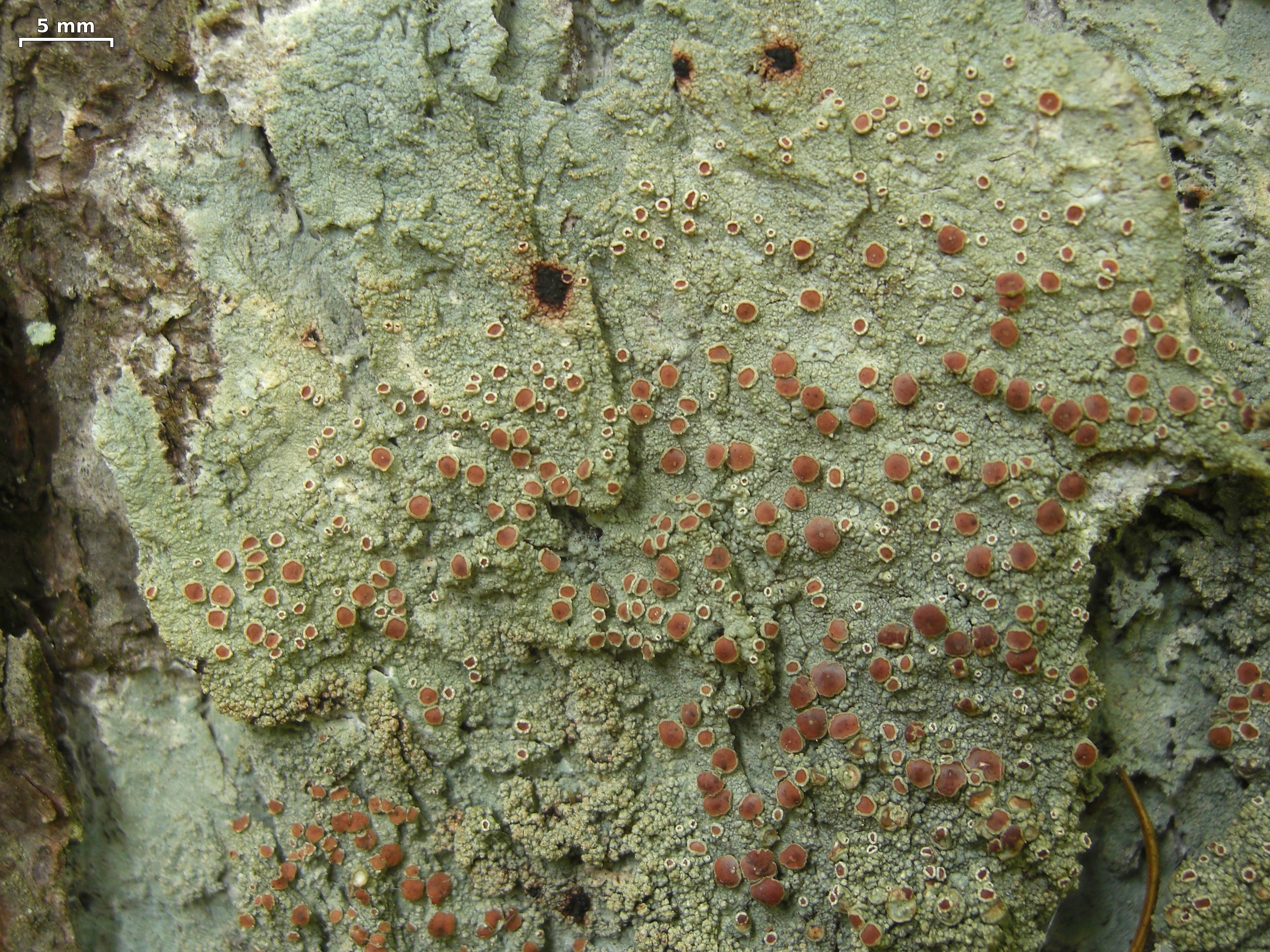
- Loxospora ochrophaea

Scientific classification
- Kingdom: Fungi
- Division: Ascomycota
- Class: Lecanoromycetes
- Order: Sarrameanales
- Family: Sarrameanaceae
- Genus: Loxospora; A.Massal. (1852)

Type species
- Loxospora elatina (Ach.) A.Massal. (1852)

= Loxospora =

Genus of lichens

Loxospora is a genus of lichen-forming fungi in the family Sarrameanaceae. The genus was established in 1852 by the Italian lichenologist Abramo Bartolommeo Massalongo and originally included species now placed in other genera. Molecular phylogenetics studies have revealed that several species previously assigned to Loxospora actually belong to a separate lineage, leading to the creation of the new genus Chicitaea in 2024. These lichens form crusty growths on bark and rock surfaces, with some species producing powdery reproductive structures whilst others develop disc-shaped fruiting bodies.

== Taxonomy ==
The genus was circumscribed by the Italian lichenologist Abramo Bartolommeo Massalongo in 1852, with Loxospora elatina assigned as the type species. This crustose lichen was originally named Lecanora elatina by Erik Acharius in 1810.

Phylogenetic and chemical studies have shown that Loxospora in the loose sense (sensu lato) actually comprises two well-supported lineages. A multilocus analysis of all 13 accepted species demonstrated that taxa producing 2'-O-methylperlatolic acid, whose asci lack an amyloid apical dome and whose ascospores are simple and broadly ellipsoid, form a clade that is distinct from the thamnolic acid-containing core of the genus. To reflect this, Ptach-Styn and colleagues (2024) segregated those species as the new genus Chicitaea, making four new combinations (C. assateaguensis, C. confusa, C. cristinae and C. lecanoriformis) and rendering Loxospora in the strict sense (sensu stricto) a chemically and morphologically coherent group.

Within Loxospora s.str., the same study detected two haplotype clusters. One corresponds to L. elatina sensu stricto, whereas the other matches the little-known taxon Pertusaria chloropolia, which was therefore resurrected and recombined as Loxospora chloropolia; lectotypes were also selected for both L. elatina and P. chloropolia to stabilise their application.

Sequences of the sorediate L. elatina and the morphologically similar but fertile L. ochrophaea are intermixed in the resulting phylogeny, suggesting a very close relationship—possibly even conspecificity. Because the two differ consistently in reproductive mode and show partially non-overlapping distributions, Ptach-Styn and colleagues retained them as separate species pending denser sampling and genomic data.

== Description ==
The thallus—the main body of a Loxospora lichen—forms a crust tightly attached to its substrate. Its surface can be thin and film-like or build into a thicker, uneven crust, and it ranges from grey to yellowish-grey. Some species develop tiny, floury patches called soralia that release powdery propagules for asexual reproduction. Inside the thallus lives a single-celled green alga of the Trebouxia type (a trebouxioid photobiont).

Sexual reproductive bodies (apothecia) appear as low, stalk-less discs that rise from small wart-like swellings of the thallus. The disc is usually brown and may carry a frost-like coating (pruina). Around the rim, fragments of the thallus form a margin that often tears and becomes ragged, sometimes itself producing soredia. Beneath the disc, the exciple—a thin band of fungal tissue—remains brown, while deeper layers (the hypothecium) are colourless. The spore-bearing layer (hymenium) turns blue when stained with iodine (I+ blue), signalling the presence of starch-like compounds. Slender, only slightly branched filaments (paraphyses) weave through the hymenium, and each sac-like ascus holds eight colourless ascospores. These spores are broadly spindle-shaped (fusiform) to ellipsoidal, tapering at both ends, often gently curved or twisted, and divided by three to seven internal walls (septa). Asexual spores form in tiny, submerged structures (pycnidia) and emerge as rod-shaped, colourless conidia. Chemically, most members of the genus produce thamnolic acid, with a few also containing gyrophoric acid.

== Species ==
- Loxospora chloropolia (Erichsen) Ptach-Styn, Guzow-Krzem., Tønsberg & Kukwa (2024)
- Loxospora cismonica (Beltr.) Hafellner (1987)
- Loxospora cyamidia (Stirt.) Kantvilas (2000)
- Loxospora elatina (Ach.) A.Massal. (1852)
- Loxospora glaucomiza (Nyl.) Kalb & Staiger (1995)
- Loxospora isidiata Kalb (1992)
- Loxospora ochrophaea (Tuck.) R.C.Harris (1990)
- Loxospora septata (Sipman & Aptroot) Kantvilas (2000)
- Loxospora solenospora (Müll.Arg.) Kantvilas (2000)

Loxospora pustulata (Brodo & W.L.Culb.) Egan (1990) is now known as Lepra pustulata.
