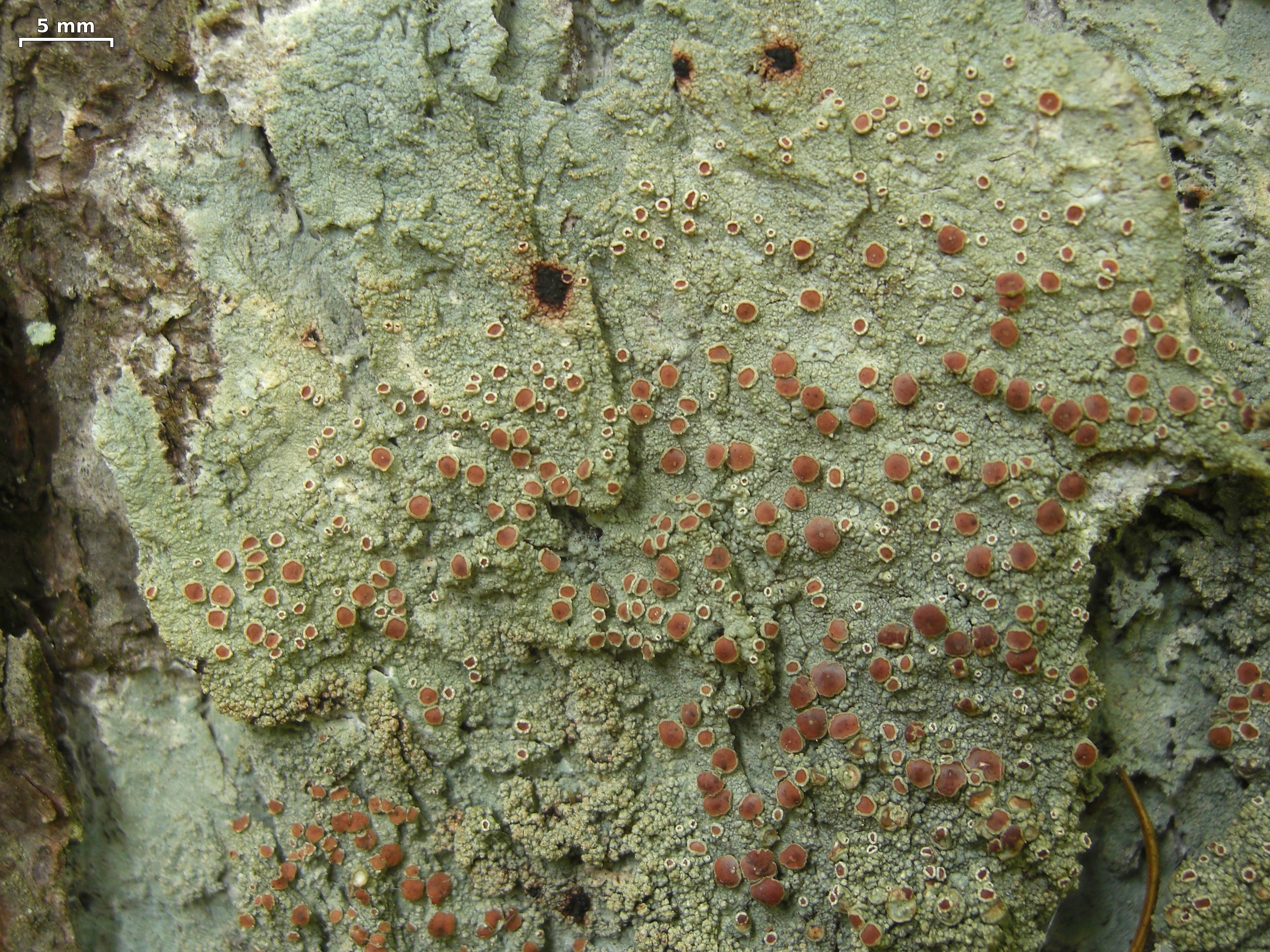
- Loxospora ochrophaea

Scientific classification
- Kingdom: Fungi
- Division: Ascomycota
- Class: Lecanoromycetes
- Subclass: Ostropomycetidae
- Order: Sarrameanales; B.P.Hodk. & Lendemer (2011)
- Family: Sarrameanaceae; Hafellner (1984)

Genera
- Chicitaea; Loxospora; Sarrameana

= Sarrameanaceae =

Family of lichen-forming fungi

Sarrameanaceae is a family of lichen-forming fungi in the monotypic order Sarrameanales. The family was established in 1984 by Josef Hafellner and contains three genera. These lichens form crust-like growths that often produce powdery reproductive structures for spreading to new locations. They have brown to black fruiting bodies and show remarkable diversity in ascospore shapes, with some species coiling their spores in tight spirals within their reproductive structures.

== Taxonomy ==
The family Sarrameanaceae was circumscribed by Josef Hafellner in 1984. It contains the genera Loxospora and Sarrameana, the type genus. The genus Chicitaea was proposed in 2024 to contain Loxospora species containing 2'-O-methylperlatolic acid. The order Sarrameanales was proposed by Brendan Hodkinson and James Lendemer in 2011, as they had noted that previously published large-scale molecular phylogenetic studies had shown that the group of species contained in the family Sarrameanaceae were distinct and separate from the clade containing all of the other orders of the Ostropomycetidae. However, the name Sarrameanales was not validly published according to the rules of botanical nomenclature, because it was not accompanied by a suitable description. Despite this, the order continues to be used in lichenological literature.

Sarrameanales is in the Ostropomycetidae; within this subclass, Sarrameanales and the order Schaereriales form a clade which has a sister relationship with a clade containing the orders Baeomycetales and Pertusariales.

== Description ==
Members of the Sarrameanaceae form a crust-like thallus that adheres closely to the substrate; in most species the surface develops powdery propagules called soredia that facilitate vegetative spread. The photosynthetic partner consists of minute, spherical green algal cells (a chlorococcoid photobiont). Sexual reproductive bodies are sessile apothecia that appear brown to black and may emerge from low, wart-like swellings of the thallus. A rim of thallus tissue is present when young but can be lost as the apothecium expands. The encasing tissue (exciple) remains thin and undifferentiated at maturity, while the spore-bearing layer (hymenium) is sometimes flecked with oil droplets. Between the asci lie mostly unbranched paraphyses.

Each ascus contains eight ascospores and has a uniform apical thickening (tholus) that may or may not stain blue in the standard iodine–potassium iodide (K/I) stain; it lacks the separate ocular chamber seen in many other lichens and is surrounded by an iodine-positive gel. The family shows striking variety in spore form: some species pack their spores in a tight helical coil within the ascus, others have one-septate spores that taper to long points, and still others produce smooth, ellipsoidal spores that remain single-celled. None of the spore types possesses an extra outer coat (perispore).

Asexual reproduction occurs in colourless pycnidia embedded in the thallus. These flask-shaped structures bear simple conidiophores that bud off rod-shaped conidia pointed at both ends, providing an additional means of dispersal.
