= Caperatic acid =

- Structure of caperatic acid

Names
- IUPAC name 2-hydroxy-2-(2-methoxy-2-oxoethyl)-3-tetradecylbutanedioic acid
- Preferred IUPAC name Caperatic acid
- Systematic IUPAC name 2-Hydroxy-1,2,3-heptadecanetricarboxylic acid monomethyl ester
- Other names: 5-Methyl hydrogen 3-C-carboxy-2,4-dideoxy-2-tetradecylpentarate; 2-Hydroxy-1,2,3-heptadecanetricarboxylic acid 1-methyl ester

Identifiers
| CAS Number | 29227-64-3 |
| 3D model (JSmol) | Interactive image |
| ChEBI | CHEBI:144132 |
| ChEMBL | ChEMBL1553256 |
| PubChem CID | 193112 |
- InChI: InChI=1S/C21H38O7/c1-3-4-5-6-7-8-9-10-11-12-13-14-15-17(19(23)24)21(27,20(25)26)16-18(22)28-2/h17,27H,3-16H2,1-2H3,(H,23,24)(H,25,26) Key: HMJJWFFZRCLIDN-UHFFFAOYSA-N
- SMILES: CCCCCCCCCCCCCCC(C(=O)O)C(CC(=O)OC)(C(=O)O)O

Properties
| Chemical formula | C_{21}H_{38}O_{7} |
| Molar mass | 402.528 g·mol^{−1} |
| Melting point | 132–133.5 °C (269.6–272.3 °F; 405.1–406.6 K) |
| Boiling point | 549.3 °C (1,020.7 °F; 822.4 K) (predicted) |
| Solubility in water | 1.017 mg/L (predicted) |
| log P | 5.7 |

Structure
| Molecular shape | Flexible chain with carboxyl groups |

Hazards
- Occupational safety and health (OHS/OSH)
| Main hazards | No significant hazards identified |
| Flash point | 180 °C (estimated) |

Related compounds
| Related compounds | Other lichen-derived depsides and acids |
- Except where otherwise noted, data are given for materials in their standard state (at 25 °C [77 °F], 100 kPa). Infobox references

Caperatic acid is a naturally occurring organic compound classified as a microbial metabolite. The compound has been reported in certain actinobacteria through fermentation and has also been identified in lichens.

== Properties ==
Caperatic acid is a crystalline organic compound. Computational models predict a boiling point of 549.3 ± 50 °C, but the compound is expected to decompose before reaching this temperature under laboratory conditions. The predicted density is 1.10 g/cm³.

== Occurrence ==
Scientists have identified caperatic acid in lichens, particularly Platismatia glauca, which grows across Europe and North America.
