= Chicita F. Culberson =

American lichenologist

- Born: Chicita Forman; November 1, 1931; Philadelphia, Pennsylvania
- Died: March 5, 2023 (aged 91)
- Education: Duke University, University of Wisconsin–Madison, University of Cincinnati
- Spouse: Bill Culberson
- Awards: Acharius Medal
- Scientific career
- Fields: Lichenology
- Workplaces: Duke University

Chicita Frances Culberson (born Chicita Frances Forman, November 1, 1931, in Philadelphia, Pennsylvania – March 5, 2023, in Durham, North Carolina) was an American lichenologist.

== Education ==
Culberson grew up on Long Island while her father worked as a surgeon in nearby New York City. She graduated with a B.S. from the University of Cincinnati in 1953, where she also met her future husband, Bill Culberson. In 1954, she received an M.S. from the University of Wisconsin, where her research involved using a radioactive nickel tracer to study the physical and chemical processes of the electrodeposition of metal on a cathode. In 1959 she received a Ph.D. from Duke University, focusing on the synthesis of bicyclic monoterpenes related to camphor.

== Career ==
After earning her Ph.D., Culberson held a two-year NSF-funded research associateship in Chemistry at Duke before joining the Department of Botany as a Senior Research Associate. Over her 50+ year career at Duke, she held various titles including Senior Research Associate, Lecturer, Adjunct Professor, and Research Professor. In the mid-1970s she and William Culberson hosted the Swedish lichenologist Ingvar Kärnefelt at Duke; he examined their Cetraria collections and later published a widely reproduced photograph of the couple at their garden table.

A botanical researcher at Duke University, Culberson pioneered the use of thin-layer chromatography in the identification of secondary lichen products, developing a standardized method that is still used today. She later refined this method and supplemented it with high-performance liquid chromatography (HPLC). In 1969, Culberson published "Chemical and Botanical Guide to Lichen Products", a major work summarizing all published knowledge of secondary metabolites made by lichens. She also produced two supplements to this guide.

Culberson's research focused on characterizing chemotypes, proposing biosynthetic pathways of lichen secondary metabolites, and studying gene flow between chemotypes. She developed skills in culturing single spore isolates and analyzing them with HPLC to search for evidence of gene flow between chemotypes.

== Personal life ==
Culberson was married to fellow lichenologist Bill Culberson from 1953, until his death in 2003. Culberson died on March 5, 2023, at Croasdaile Village, a senior adult community in Durham, North Carolina.

== Legacy ==
Culberson's work significantly contributed to the growth and value of the lichen collection at Duke University. The W. L. & C. F. Lichen Herbarium and Library at Duke, named in honor of the Culbersons, contains an estimated 14,000 specimens analyzed by Chicita out of a total of 108,000 specimens. Her perspective on chemical stability versus morphological variability in lichens influenced many other lichenologists.

== Recognition ==
In 1992, Culberson became one of the first modern recipients of the Acharius Medal.

Culberson was a lifelong member of both the American Chemical Society and the American Bryological and Lichenological Society, serving as President of the latter from 1996–1997. In 2006, she received the Botanical Society of America's Centennial Award for "exemplary service to the plant sciences". In 2022, she was made an honorary lifetime member of the British Lichen Society for her outstanding contributions to research on lichen secondary metabolites. At the 9th International Association for Lichenology conference held virtually in Brazil on August 4, 2021, the lichen chemistry symposium was dedicated to Culberson for her 90th birthday.

=== Eponymy ===
In 2000, the lichenologist Theodore Esslinger circumscribed Culbersonia, which is a fungal genus in the family Caliciaceae and named in Bill Culberson and Chicita F. Culberson's honor, his "longtime friends and mentors". The lichen genus Chicitaea, proposed in 2024, honors Culberson "for her foundational, pioneering and lifelong contributions to the fields of lichen chemistry and lichen taxonomy".

== See also ==
- Category:Taxa named by Chicita F. Culberson

== Sources ==
- Biography of Dr Culberson at Lichenology.org
