= William Louis Culberson =

American lichenologist

- Born: April 5, 1929; Indianapolis, Indiana, United States
- Died: February 8, 2003 (aged 73); Durham, North Carolina, United States
- Education: University of Cincinnati, University of Paris, University of Wisconsin–Madison
- Spouse: Chicita F. Forman (m. 1953)
- Awards: Acharius Medal (1992)
- Scientific career
- Fields: Lichenology
- Workplaces: Duke University
- Doctoral advisor: John Walter Thomson

William Louis "Bill" Culberson (April 5, 1929 in Indianapolis, Indiana – February 8, 2003 in Durham, North Carolina) was an American lichenologist.

== Professional history ==
Culberson earned his bachelor's degree at the University of Cincinnati, where he was influenced by E. Lucy Braun; he subsequently attended the University of Paris and the University of Wisconsin–Madison.

In 1955, Culberson joined the botany department at Duke University; he subsequently managed Duke's acquisition of the lichen-centric herbaria of Julien Harmand and Johan Havaas. He served as the Hugo L. Blomquist Professor. In 2010, the lichen collection was officially named the William Louis & Chicita F. Culberson Lichen Herbarium & Library. In the mid-1970s he hosted Ingvar Kärnefelt at Duke; Kärnefelt studied the Culbersons' collections of Cetraria and later published a widely reproduced photograph he took of William and Chicita Culberson seated at their garden table.

He served as president of the Botanical Society of America and the American Bryological and Lichenological Society and as director of the Sarah P. Duke Gardens. He was the first editor-in-chief of the journal Systematic Botany. In 1992, he became one of the first modern recipients of the Acharius Medal.

In 2000, Theodore Esslinger erected Culbersonia, which is a fungal genus in the family Caliciaceae and named in Bill Culberson and Chicita F. Culberson's honour, his "longtime friends and mentors".

== Personal life ==
In 1953, Dr. Culberson married fellow lichenologist Chicita F. Forman.

== See also ==
- Category:Taxa named by William Louis Culberson
