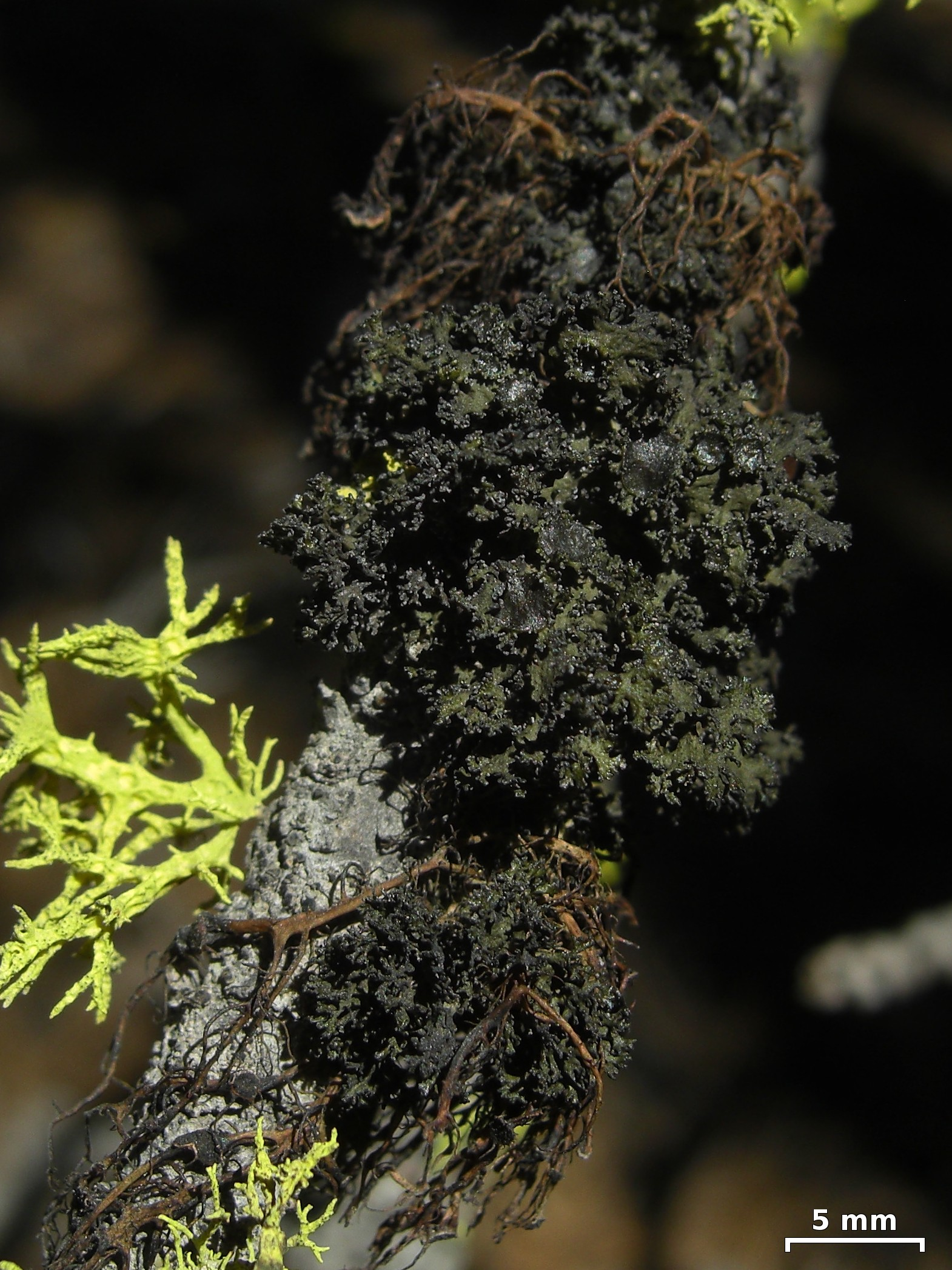
- In Satus Pass, Washington, USA

Conservation status
- Secure (NatureServe)

Scientific classification
- Kingdom: Fungi
- Division: Ascomycota
- Class: Lecanoromycetes
- Order: Lecanorales
- Family: Parmeliaceae
- Genus: Kaernefeltia
- Species: K. merrillii

Binomial name
- Kaernefeltia merrillii (Du Rietz) A.Thell & Goward (1996)

Synonyms
- List: Cetraria merrillii Du Rietz (1926); Cetraria californica var. tuckermanii R.Howe (1911); Cornicularia californica f. tuckermanii (R.Howe) Zahlbr. (1930); Tuckermannopsis merrillii (Du Rietz) Hale (1987); Nephromopsis merrillii (Du Rietz) Divakar, A.Crespo & Lumbsch (2017)

= Kaernefeltia merrillii =

Species of lichen-forming fungus

Kaernefeltia merrillii, the flattened thornbrush lichen, is a species of lichen in the family Parmeliaceae. It forms small, dark greenish-black to olive tufts typically less than 2 cm across, with finely divided, narrow lobes. The species is found in western North America from Alaska to California, growing primarily on the twigs of conifers and shrubs in forested areas. First described in 1926, it has been placed in several different genera over the years, with its classification remaining a subject of debate among lichen specialists.

== Taxonomy ==
The lichen was first described by Gustaf Einar Du Rietz in 1926, as Cetraria merrillii, from collections made in California; George Knox Merrill had already recognized the taxon in 1910 but did not name it. An earlier, intervening name, Cetraria tuckermanii Herre (1906; printed 'Centraria tuckermani' in the protologue), is illegitimate as a later homonym of Oakes's Cetraria tuckermanii (1843); R. Howe (1911) subsequently used the epithet at varietal rank as Cetraria californica var. tuckermanii. In 1996, Arne Thell and Trevor Goward designated a lectotype from Herre's "Krypt. Exs. Vind." no. 1047 held at the herbarium at Lund University (with numerous isotypes elsewhere). They also noted that the Arizona State University herbarium (ASU) isotype contains a mixture including K. californica, demonstrating why a clear lectotypification was necessary. The name Cetraria iberica (published from Spain by Ana Crespo and Eva Barreno in 1980) was treated as conspecific within the range of variation of K. merrillii.

Mason Hale later transferred the species to Tuckermannopsis (in 1987), yielding Tuckermannopsis merrillii. Thell and Goward rejected this placement because the two groups differ in key microscopic features: Tuckermannopsis species have spherical ascospores and dumbbell-shaped pycnoconidia (asexual spores), whereas K. merrillii has oval ascospores and disc-bar-shaped pycnoconidia and different lichen products. On these grounds they rejected the Tuckermannopsis placement and made the new combination Kaernefeltia merrillii.

In 2017, Pradeep Divakar, Ana Crespo, and H. Thorsten Lumbsch proposed reorganizing the Parmeliaceae using a "temporal banding" approach based on evolutionary timelines, arguing that each genus should represent lineages that diverged from their relatives about 29–33 million years ago. Applying this scheme, they merged several cetrarioid genera into Nephromopsis and treated Kaernefeltia merrillii as Nephromopsis merrillii. The move was contentious: Robert Lücking subsequently criticized temporal banding as a primary criterion for fungal and lichen taxonomy, and the broad synonymy of cetrarioid genera has seen limited uptake. As a result, usage remains mixed: some databases accept the species under Nephromopsis, whereas recent regional treatments and field guides retain Kaernefeltia (or in some cases use older cetrarioid placements).

== Description ==
Kaernefeltia merrillii forms a small, dark thallus usually less than 2 cm across. The color ranges from dark greenish-black to dark olive or black. The lobes are somewhat fruticose, that is, short, narrow, and somewhat bushy, and are typically finely divided to under 1 mm wide, though occasional lobes exceed 1 mm. The surface lacks vegetative propagules: both soredia and isidia are absent.

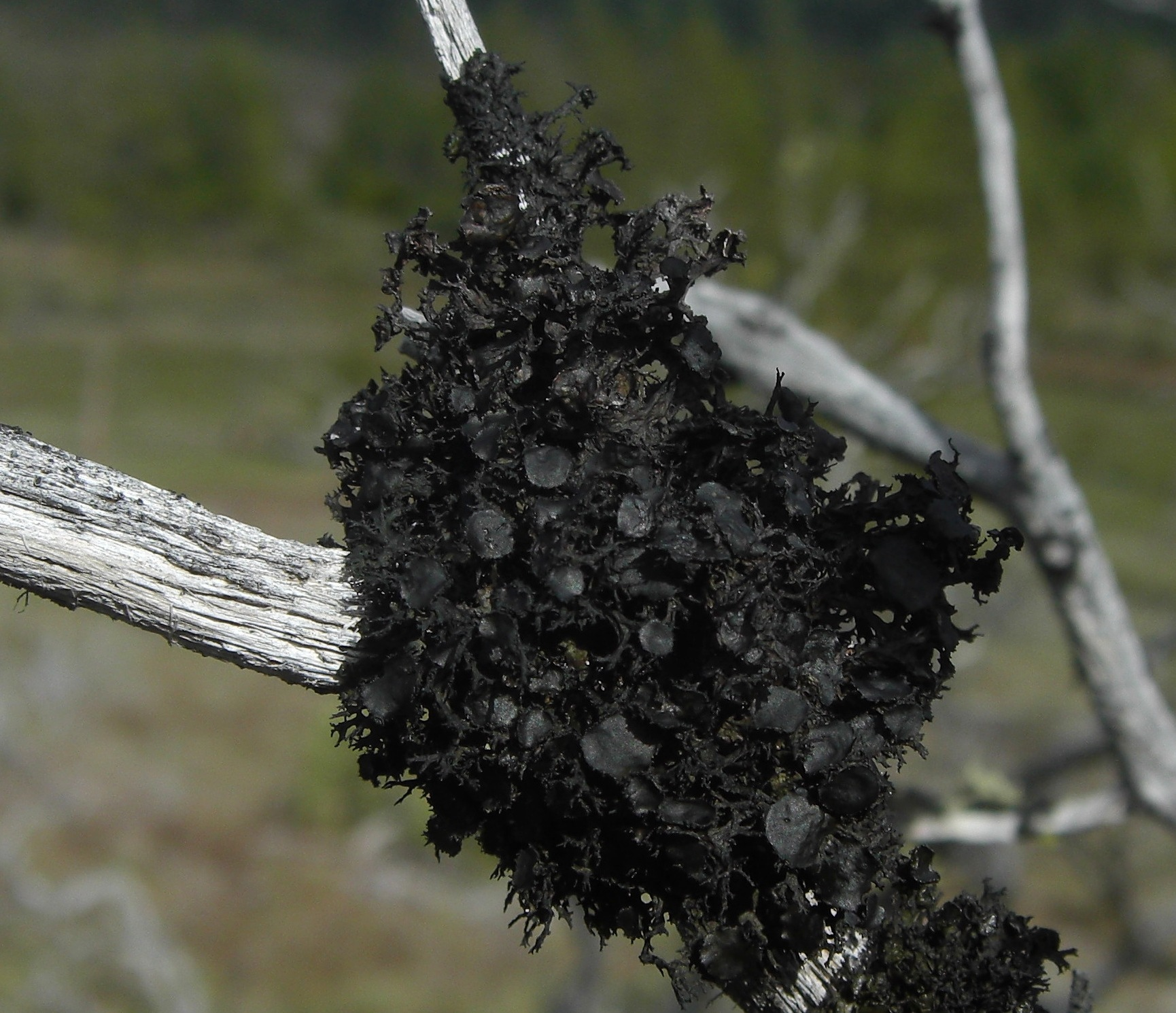
On decorticated wood

Sexual structures (apothecia) are common and match the thallus in color. Standard spot test reactions are negative. In the field the species can be mistaken for other dark olive-black cetrarioid species, but the combination of a very small thallus, finely dissected narrow lobes, absence of soredia and isidia, and negative spot tests is diagnostic.

== Habitat and distribution ==
The geographical range of Kaernefeltia merrillii spans western North America, from southeastern Alaska and the Yukon southward through British Columbia to California, and reaches inland as far as western Montana. The species is most abundant in the region between the Cascade Range crest and the Continental Divide, with particularly robust populations occurring in the Siskiyou Mountains of southern Oregon and northern California. It does not occur along the immediate Pacific coastline. It has also been reported from northern Mexico and, disjunctly, from the central highlands of Spain, where it grows on the twigs of Cistus ladanifer.

The lichen colonizes bark and wood substrates, especially the twigs of conifers such as whitebark pine (Pinus albicaulis), lodgepole pine (P. contorta), ponderosa pine (P. ponderosa), and western larch (Larix occidentalis); it also occurs on shrubs, particularly manzanita (Arctostaphylos). It favors well-lit branches in forests and exposed trees, including P. albicaulis on rocky ridges, and can also be found high in the canopies of moist, low-elevation forests. Across its range it is present at all forested elevations, from near sea level to about 2,200 m (7,200 ft). In northern California and southern Oregon it is a conspicuous element of heavily lichenized shrubs on serpentine barrens and in open Pinus jeffreyi woodlands, and east of the Cascades it is often abundant on fallen pine branches, forming dense communities alongside Vulpicida canadensis, Cetraria platyphylla, Letharia vulpina, and Nodobryoria abbreviata. Other commonly recorded lichen associates include Bryoria fremontii, B. fuscescens, Letharia columbiana, and Tuckermannopsis orbata.
