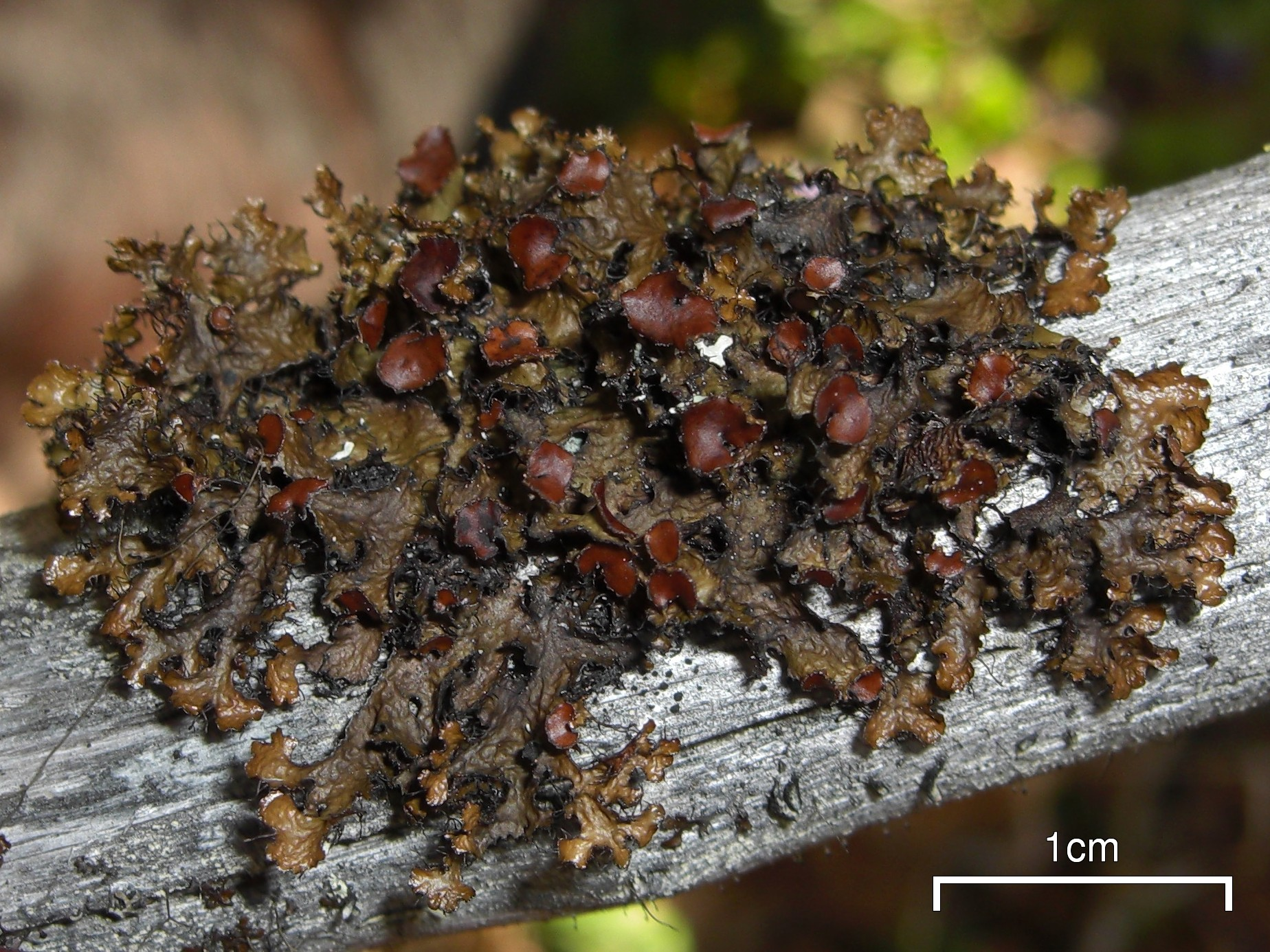

Conservation status
- Secure (NatureServe)

Scientific classification
- Kingdom: Fungi
- Division: Ascomycota
- Class: Lecanoromycetes
- Order: Lecanorales
- Family: Parmeliaceae
- Genus: Tuckermannopsis
- Species: T. orbata

Binomial name
- Tuckermannopsis orbata (Nyl.) M.J.Lai (1980)

Synonyms
- Platysma orbatum Nyl. (1869); Cetraria orbata (Nyl.) Fink (1919); Nephromopsis orbata (Nyl.) Divakar, A.Crespo & Lumbsch (2017)

= Tuckermannopsis orbata =

Species of lichen

Tuckermannopsis orbata, commonly known as the variable wrinkle lichen, is a species of foliose lichen in the family Parmeliaceae. It is a small cetrarioid lichen, an informal growth form category that denotes lichens with erect, foliose thalli, and apothecia (sexual fruiting bodies) and pycnidia (asexual fruiting bodies) on the margins of the ruffled lobes. Tuckermannopsis orbata is found in Asia and North America, growing primarily on the wood and bark of mostly birch and coniferous tree branches and twigs.

== Taxonomy ==
The species was first formally described as a new to science in 1869 by the Finnish lichenologist William Nylander, who placed it in the genus Platysma. The type specimen was collected in California by the American botanist Henry Nicholas Bolander. Nylander noted the species to be similar to what is now known as Tuckermannopsis ciliaris, but it lacked cilia, and did not react (in either the upper cortex or the medulla) to the potassium hydroxide chemical spot test (K−). Bruce Fink transferred it to the genus Cetraria in 1919, and it was known as a member of this genus was several decades, until Ming-Jou Lai proposed a transfer to the genus Tuckermannopsis in 1980.

Using a "temporal phylogenetic" approach to study the evolution of the Parmeliaceae, researchers proposed that certain genera, including Tuckermannopsis, should be merged with Nephromopsis, but this suggestion was later disputed, and the change in classification has not been universally accepted, particularly by some North American lichenologists. A recent (2023) field guide has gone another nomenclatural direction and instead reverted to using Cetraria in the broad sense for cetrarioid species in the commonly used segregate genera Kaernefeltia, Tuckermannopsis and Vulpicida, including "Cetraria orbata".

It is commonly known as the "variable wrinkle lichen", although it has also been called "variable ruffle" and "spruce globes".

== Description ==
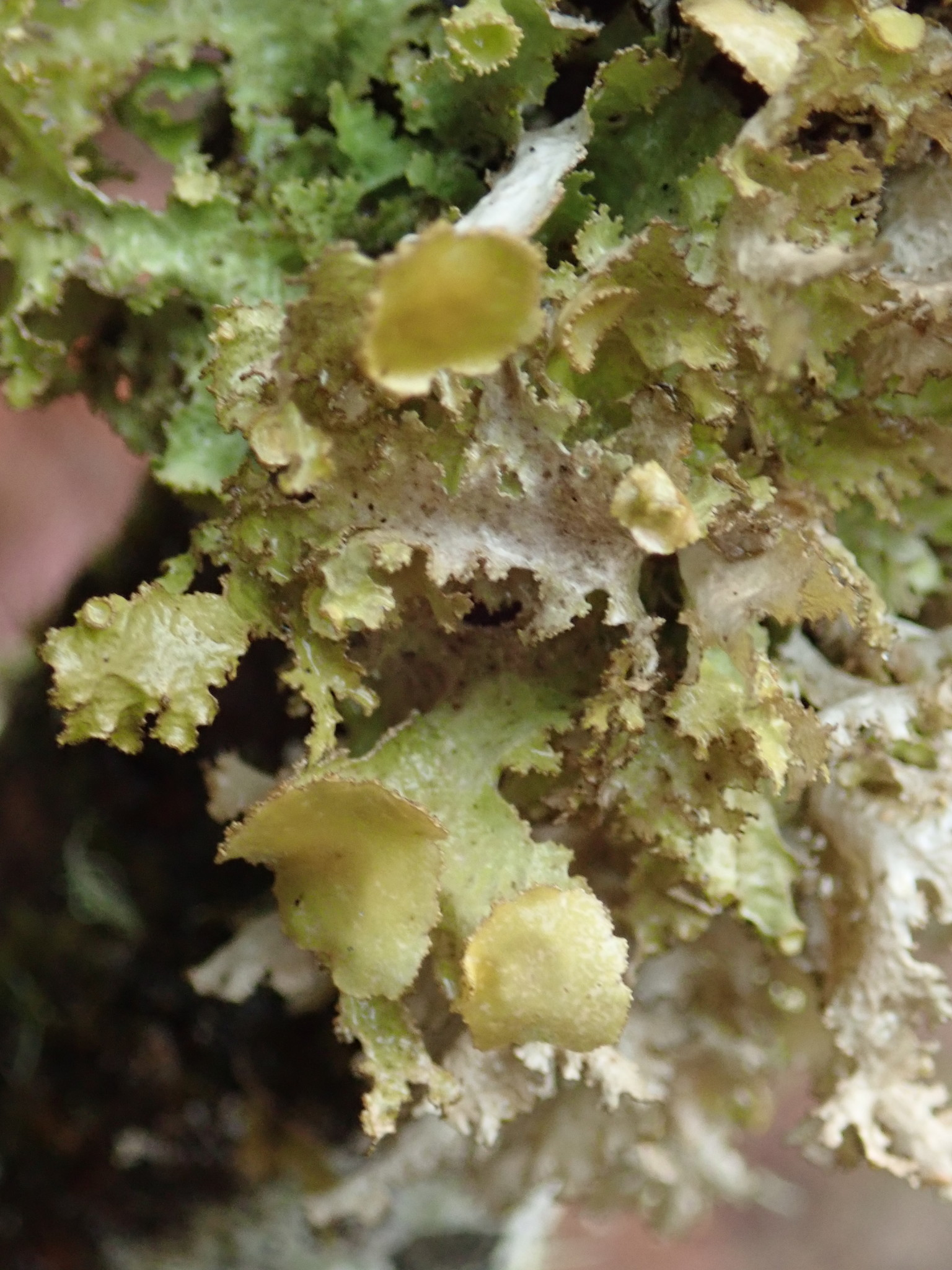
Thalli grown in shade conditions are paler than those grown in the sun.

Tuckermannopsis orbata has a foliose (leafy) thallus that ranges in color from olive-brown to pale green when grown in the shade, to brown when exposed to the sun. It is loosely attached to its substrate. The dthallus typically reaches up to 5 cm (2 in) in diameter, although diameters up to 10 cm (4 in) have been recorded. The thallus features ascending or appressed, ruffled lobes that are 1.5 to 3.5 mm (1/16 to 1/8 in) wide. The margins of the lobes can bear prominent black pycnidia, flattened and branched lobules (small lobes originating from the edge or surface), or brown to black cilia, with various combinations of these structures or none at all. This species lacks soredia and true isidia; however, the lobules, especially when branched and bearing pycnidia, can often resemble isidia. There are pseudocyphellae (tiny pores for gas exchange) scattered on the upper surface. The lower surface of the thallus is pale brown, strongly wrinkled, and sometimes scattered with pale rhizines.

Apothecia (fruiting bodies) are very common and often abundant in Tuckermannopsis orbata. Lecanorine in form, they originate on both the lower and upper sides of the lobe margins or on the lobe surface. They are usually up to 7 mm wide (sometimes up to 10 mm) with a brown disc that is either concave or convex. The asci are cylindrical and uniseriate with a small tholus, and measure 30–40 by 8–10 μm. The ascospores are roughly spherical, measuring about 6 μm in diameter. Pycnidia can be found both laminally and marginally. The pycnidia are dark and glossy, with a shape resembling a papilla or a barrel. The appearance of this species has been described as the most variable in genus Tuckermannopsis.

There are no reactions to any of the standard spot tests (K−, KC−, C−, Pd−, UV−), but the lichen does contain protolichesterinic acid, a secondary metabolite (lichen product) that is a fatty acid.

=== Similar species ===
Tuckermanella fendleri is roughly similar in appearance with a similar chemistry, but has smaller lobes that are closely attached to the substrate. Tuckermannopsis ciliaris is distinguished most reliable by its chemistry: it has a C+ (red) medulla. Another potential lookalike, broadly distributed across the North American boreal forest, Cetraria halei, is distinguished by having more cilia on its margins and a distinct chemistry that includes alectorialic acid. This acid can be detected by its UV+ (white) reaction. Similarly, Tuckermannopsis americana, which also contains alectorialic acid, can also be distinguished from T. orbata using the UV test. Broad-lobed specimens of Kaernefeltia merrillii have been suggested as another potential lookalike.

== Habitat, distribution, and ecology ==
Tuckermannopsis orbata is typically found on the branches and twigs of birch and conifer trees, though it also occur on hardwoods, and, very rarely, on rock. In the Great Smoky Mountains National Park, it has been recorded on eastern hemlock, red spruce, yellow birch, and, at higher elevations, on Rhododendron.

It occurs in both northeastern and northwestern North America. In the Pacific Northwest region, it prefers humid, low-elevation forests, and is common in areas close to the Pacific Coast. The western range of the species extends north to Alaska. In eastern North America it is more common at higher elevations.

Tremella nephromopsidis is a lichenicolous fungus that has been recorded parasitizing the thalli of Tuckermannopsis orbata in California. Infection by the fungus results in the formation of a gall on the thallus surface, pale to medium brown in color and measuring 0.3–1.2 mm.
