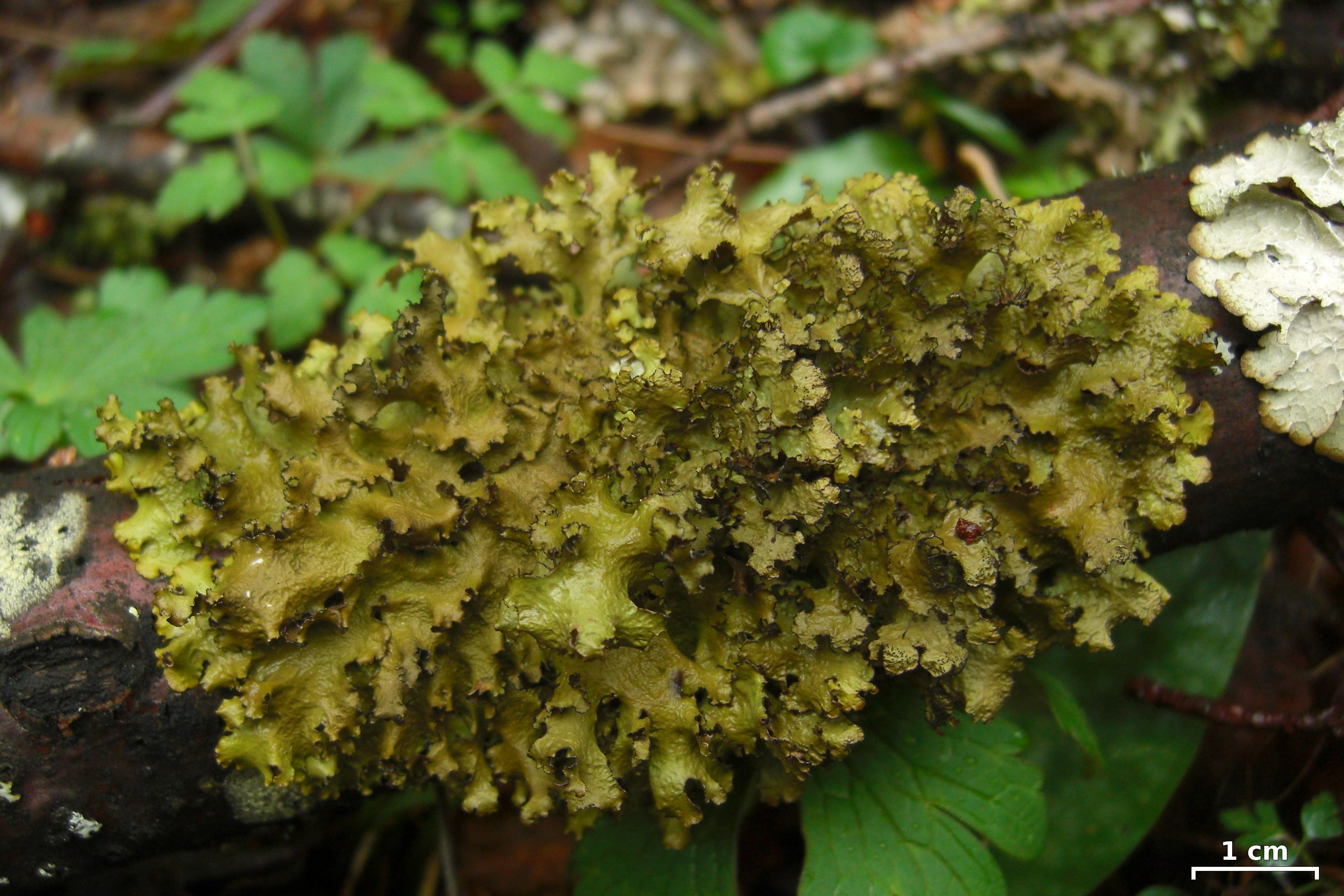

Conservation status
- Secure (NatureServe)

Scientific classification
- Kingdom: Fungi
- Division: Ascomycota
- Class: Lecanoromycetes
- Order: Lecanorales
- Family: Parmeliaceae
- Genus: Tuckermannopsis
- Species: T. ciliaris

Binomial name
- Tuckermannopsis ciliaris (Ach.) Gyeln. (1933)

Synonyms
- Cetraria ciliaris Ach. (1810); Platysma ciliare (Ach.) Frege (1812); Lichen squarrosus * ciliaris (Ach.) Lam. (1813); Parmelia muhlenbergii Spreng. (1827); Nephromopsis ciliaris (Ach.) Hue (1899)

= Tuckermannopsis ciliaris =

Species of lichen

Tuckermannopsis ciliaris is a species of corticolous (bark-dwelling), foliose lichen in the family Parmeliaceae. It was first described by Erik Acharius in 1810, initially classified in the genus Cetraria. The species was later reclassified into the genera Nephromopsis and then Tuckermannopsis, with some researchers proposing that certain cetrarioid genera, including Tuckermannopsis, should be merged into Nephromopsis. However, this suggestion was disputed, and both names, Tuckermannopsis ciliaris and Nephromopsis ciliaris, are used in recent literature to refer to this species.

Tuckermannopsis ciliaris is widely distributed across temperate regions of North America and the northern Old World, found on birches and coniferous trees such as pines, with varying frequencies and habitats across different regions. The thallus grows in irregular shapes or rosettes up to 5 cm (2 in) in diameter, with olive-green to greenish-brown coloration and elongated lobes featuring black, hair-like cilia along their edges. Both apothecia (sexual fruiting bodies) and pycnidia (asexual fruiting bodies) also occur along the edges of the lobes.

The chemical properties of T. ciliaris include the presence of olivetoric and physodic acids in the medulla. Chemical spot tests for these lichen products can help distinguish T. ciliaris from several similar species.

== Taxonomy ==
The lichen was formally described in 1810 by the Swedish lichenologist Erik Acharius, who initially classified it in Cetraria, the namesake genus of the cetrarioid lichens. Cetrarioid lichens are characterised by erect, foliose thalli, and apothecia and pycnidia on the margins of the lobes. In his original description, Acharius summarised the main characteristics of the new species, noting that the thallus is pale brownish with a whitish, reticulated-lacunose underside. He emphasised two key diagnostic features that remain important today: the crisped, ciliate lobes with thick black cilia or granules along their margins, and the cartilaginous thallus texture that becomes more reticulated-lacunose with age. The apothecia are slightly elevated and dark brownish, with a raised, crenate margin. These morphological characteristics, particularly the distinctive ciliate lobes, helped distinguish it as a new species. Cetraria ciliaris resembles the variety ulophylla of Cetraria sepincola but was much larger and more solid.

In 1899, Auguste-Marie Hue proposed reclassifying the species in genus Nephromopsis. Christian August Frege thought it was more appropriate in the genus Platysma, and moved it there in an 1812 publication. Vilmos Kőfaragó-Gyelnik transferred the taxon to the genus Tuckermannopsis in 1933.

In 1963, Mason Hale identified three chemical strains within the Cetraria ciliaris group in North America, distinguished by their production of alectoronic acid, olivetoric acid, and protolichesteric acid. This study emphasised the importance of chemical characteristics in distinguishing morphologically identical species and laid the groundwork for further chemical taxonomy in this group of lichens. Building on this, a study by William and Chicita Culberson in 1967 on the Cetraria ciliaris species complex identified several species within the group, each distinguished by its unique chemical composition and geographic distribution. The study revealed that Cetraria ciliaris produces olivetoric and physodic acids and is found in eastern North America and Finland. The species is morphologically similar to Cetraria halei, which produces alectoronic acid and has a broader geographic distribution, including the Old World from Finland through the Soviet Union to Japan. Despite the morphological similarities, these species are chemically distinct and occupy slightly different ecological niches. A key aspect of the study was the finding that environmental factors do not significantly influence the chemical composition of these lichens. Instead, the chemical profiles are genetically determined, underscoring the importance of chemical characteristics in lichen taxonomy.

Using a phylogenetic approach that incorporated estimates of when different groups evolved over time, researchers proposed that certain genera, including Tuckermannopsis, should be merged with Nephromopsis. However, this suggestion was later disputed, and the change in classification has not been universally accepted, particularly by some North American lichenologists. Consequently, both names, Tuckermannopsis ciliaris and Nephromopsis ciliaris, have been used in recent literature to refer to this species.

== Description ==
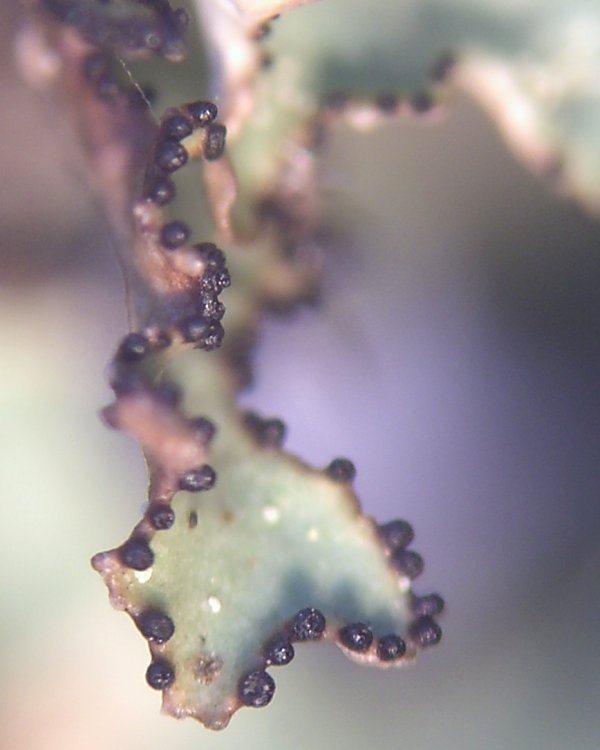
Closeup (30x magnification) of pycnidia lining the lobe margins

Tuckermannopsis ciliaris is a foliose lichen that typically forms loosely attached, irregular to rosette-shaped growths, reaching up to about 8 cm (3 in) in diameter. Its colour ranges from olive-green to greenish-brown. The lobes comprising the thallus (the main body of the lichen) are elongated and range from 1 to 4 mm in width, with a slightly wrinkled surface. These lobes often have scattered, long, black, hair-like structures called cilia along their edges; the cilia are simple (unbranched), and measure up to 7 mm long. The upper surface of the thallus varies in color from pale to dark greenish-brown, and it lacks pseudocyphellae, which are tiny pores sometimes found in lichens. The medulla is white.

The lower surface of the thallus ranges in color from brown to blackish and has a somewhat wrinkled texture. There are simple brown rhizines (small, rootlike structures) in the central part of the thallus that measure 1.5–3 long. The reproductive structures of the lichen, the apothecia, are found along the edges and sides of the lobes and can grow up to 3 mm in diameter. These apothecia produce spores that are roughly spherical and measure 4 to 5 μm in both length and width.

Additionally, Tuckermannopsis ciliaris has small, black, protruding structures along the margins called pycnidia, which produce conidia (asexual spores). The conidia are dumbbell-shaped and measure approximately 5 μm in length and 1 μm in width.

=== Chemistry ===
The expected results of standard chemical spot tests for Tuckermannopsis ciliaris are K−, C−, KC+ (reddish), and P− in the medulla; all spot tests are negative on the cortex. The species produces olivetoric and physodic acids in the medulla and atranorin in the cortex. The joint occurrence of olivetoric acid and its corresponding depsidone, physodic acid, was the first known example of such a relationship, supporting the theory of the origin of depsidones from depsides.

== Similar species ==
Tuckermannopsis ciliaris can be easily confused with some other species due to its morphology and presence of cilia. One such species is Nephromopsis ahtii, which shares a similar appearance and the presence of cilia. However, Tuckermannopsis ciliaris can be distinguished by the presence of atranorin and olivetoric acids as secondary metabolites.

Another species that resembles Tuckermannopsis ciliaris is Nephromopsis chlorophylla. While it has a similar thallus colour and size, it lacks cilia and contains protolichesterinic acid in its thallus, which sets it apart from Tuckermannopsis ciliaris. Two other potential lookalikes, Tuckermannopsis orbata and Tuckermannopsis fendleri, can be distinguished from T. ciliaris by their negative reaction to calcium hypochlorite (C−) in the medulla.

Tuckermannopsis americana is a chemical variant (chemotype) of T. ciliaris that produces different substances, alectoronic acid and α-collatolic acid, instead of the olivetoric and physodic acids found in typical T. ciliaris. It is usually treated as a distinct species, although some sources treat the two species as one. Tuckermannopsis americana is C− in the medulla, but shows a positive UV+ (bluish-white) reaction because of the alectoronic acid.

== Habitat and distribution ==
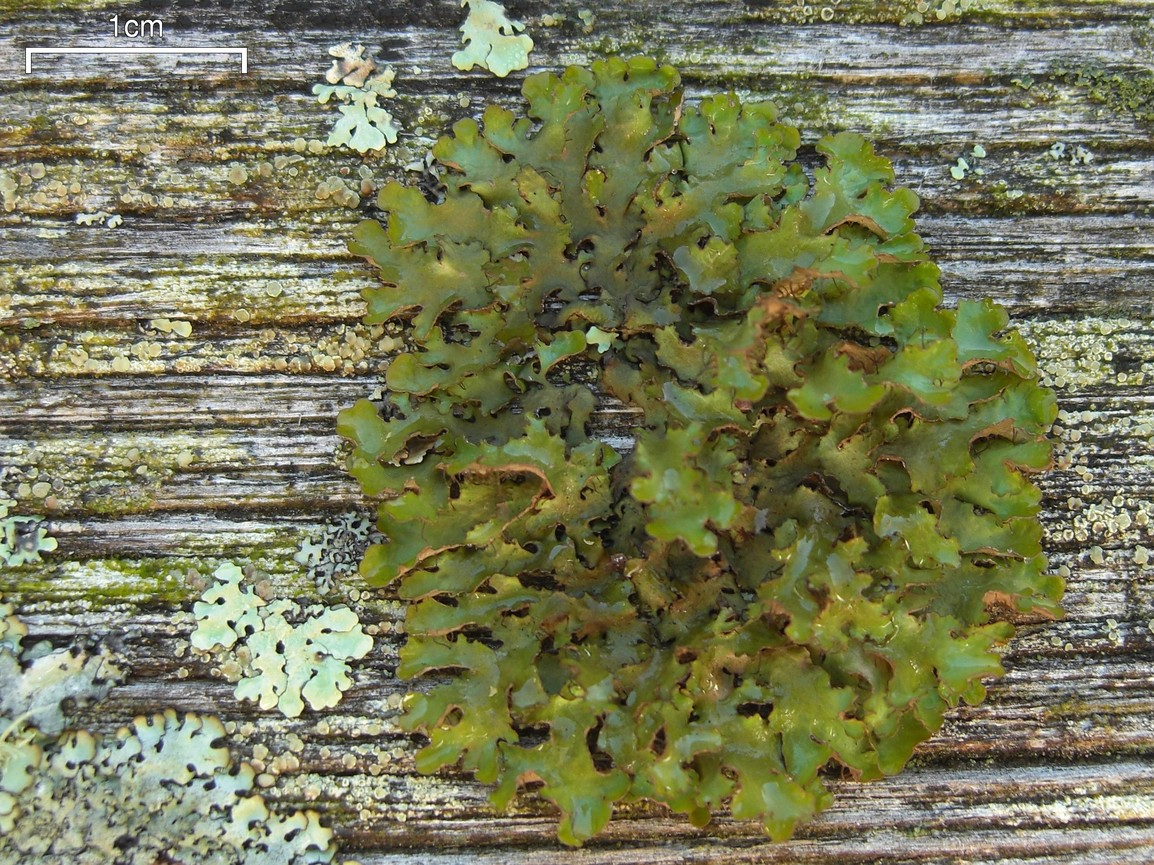
T. ciliaris in the Smoky Mountains (North Carolina), USA)

Tuckermannopsis ciliaris is distributed across a wide range of regions. In North America, it is found from southeastern Canada to the Lake States and south throughout the Appalachian Mountains and associated foothills. It is generally common in appropriate habitats in northern North America, except for the Great Plains region. In the Old World, it is distributed from Finland through Russia to Japan. In Finland, it is considered rare or possibly extinct, and has a conservation status of "regionally extinct" in the Finnish red list. It was reported as new to India in 2022, where it is considered rare. The species typically grows on the trunks and branches of pines and other conifers. In the Nordic countries, it has only been recorded growing on birch bark.

== Uses ==
Tuckermannopsis ciliaris is an auxiliary component of a hair tint that was patented in Korea in 2004.
