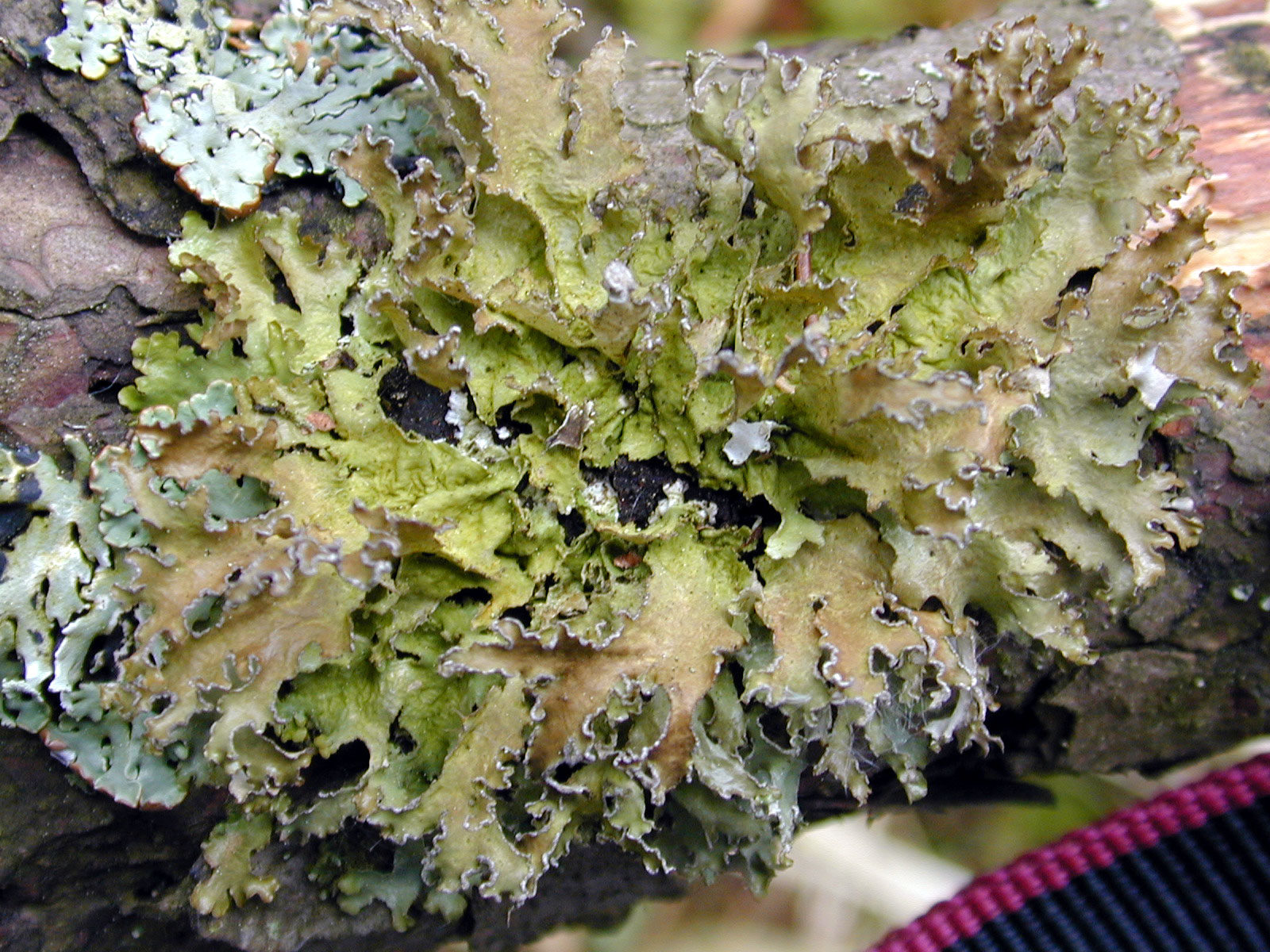

Conservation status
- Secure (NatureServe)

Scientific classification
- Kingdom: Fungi
- Division: Ascomycota
- Class: Lecanoromycetes
- Order: Lecanorales
- Family: Parmeliaceae
- Genus: Tuckermannopsis
- Species: T. chlorophylla

Binomial name
- Tuckermannopsis chlorophylla (Willd.) Hale (1987)

Synonyms
- List: Lichen chlorophyllus Willd. (1793); Peltigera chlorophylla (Willd.) Willd. (1797); Peltidea chlorophylla (Willd.) Ach. (1803); Cetraria sepincola f. chlorophylla (Willd.) Körb. (1854); Platysma sepincola var. chlorophyllum (Willd.) Berdau (1876); Platysma sepincola f. chlorophyllum (Willd.) Arnold (1881); Platysma chlorophyllum (Willd.) Vain. (1881); Cetraria chlorophylla (Willd.) Vain. (1896); Nephromopsis chlorophylla (Willd.) Divakar, A.Crespo & Lumbsch (2017); Cetraria scutata (Wulfen) Poetsch (1872); Cetraria subscutata D.C.Linds. (1973)

= Tuckermannopsis chlorophylla =

Species of lichen

Tuckermannopsis chlorophylla, the powdered wrinkle-lichen, is a species of foliose lichen in the family Parmeliaceae. First described in 1793 by the German botanist Carl Ludwig Willdenow, the species has undergone numerous taxonomic revisions over two centuries, being transferred between genera including Peltigera, Peltidea, Cetraria, and most recently Nephromopsis, though this last placement remains controversial. The lichen forms small, loose tufts of pale to medium brown lobes that turn olive-green when wet, with powdery grey-white soredia along the lobe margins serving as the primary means of reproduction. It grows on the bark of trees and shrubs in forests and along roadsides, as well as on wooden fence posts and occasionally on rocks. T. chlorophylla has a widespread distribution across the Northern Hemisphere in temperate to boreal regions of Europe, Asia, and North America, and is also found in subantarctic locations including South Georgia and the Kerguelen Islands. The species is distinguished chemically by the presence of protolichesterinic acid in its medulla and the absence of usnic acid in its cortex.

== Taxonomy ==
The species was first scientifically described by the German botanist Carl Ludwig Willdenow in 1793, as Lichen chlorophyllus. Willdenow characterized it as a lichen with ascending leaf-like margins that are crisp and olive-green above but white below, collected from the bark of pine trees in forests near the Hals estate (Vorwerk Hals). In his diagnosis, he described it as an imbricate (overlapping) lichen with ascending, lobate-laciniate (deeply divided into lobes) foliose margins that are crisp, smooth or greenish-fuscous above, and white or greenish-fuscous below with a white underside that is somewhat hairy. He noted that the "shields" (apothecia, or fruiting bodies) are rarely seen.

Willdenow provided two observations distinguishing this species from related taxa. First, he noted that very fragile, brownish specimens when moistened with water become green-viridian, which he stated with certainty represented Lichen chlorophyllus, whose synonym he reported had been published by Olof Swartz in Nova Acta Academiae Scientiarum Petropolitanae in 1792. Second, he distinguished it from Lichen herbaceus and Lichen laetevirens (now both considered synonyms of Ricasolia virens), which have more erect, less lobed leaves with inferior white margins and very crowded fruiting bodies, as well as from Lichen olivaceus, L. pullus, L. perlatus, and L. glaucus, which have white or olive fronts with neither white nor dark upper surfaces or dark lower surfaces. The type specimen of Tuckermannopsis chlorophylla was collected in Vendsyssel, Denmark; it is housed at the herbarium of the Natural History Museum of Denmark (herbarium code C).

Over the following two centuries, the species underwent numerous taxonomic revisions and transfers between genera. Willdenow himself transferred it to Peltigera in 1797, and Erik Acharius subsequently placed it in Peltidea in 1803. The species was later treated at various ranks within Cetraria sepincola and Platysma sepincola by authors including Körber (1854), Berdau (1876), and Arnold (1881). Vainio elevated it to species rank as Platysma chlorophyllum in 1881 and later transferred it to Cetraria in 1896, where it remained for over a century.

In 2017, a major molecular phylogenetics study by Pradeep Divakar, Ana Crespo, and H. Thorsten Lumbsch applied a temporal phylogenetic method to establish what they argued would be a more consistent classification system for the lichen family Parmeliaceae. This approach used time-calibrated evolutionary trees to identify temporal bands for specific taxonomic ranks, proposing that genera should represent groups of species that diverged within a specific time window of approximately 29–33 million years ago. Based on this criterion, they synonymized Tuckermannopsis and several other related genera with Nephromopsis, transferring T. chlorophylla to Nephromopsis chlorophylla. However, this reclassification proved controversial. Prominent lichen taxonomist Robert Lücking later published a critical analysis questioning the validity of the temporal phylogenetic technique for fungal and lichen systematics, and the proposed synonymization of the cetrarioid genera was not widely adopted by the lichenological community. The taxonomic status of T. chlorophylla remains unsettled, with different contemporary authorities adopting different classifications: some fungal taxonomic databases follow the 2017 reclassification to Nephromopsis, while recent regional treatments and field guides continue to use Tuckermannopsis or even place the species in the broader genus Cetraria.

The taxon Cetraria subscutata, described by Denis Christopher Lindsay in 1973 from coastal rocks in South Georgia and named for its resemblance to Cetraria scutata, is now considered synonymous with Tuckermannopsis chlorophylla; Cetraria scutata is also a synonym.

In North America, it is commonly known as the "powdered wrinkle-lichen". Another vernacular name that has been used is "shadow ruffle".

== Description ==
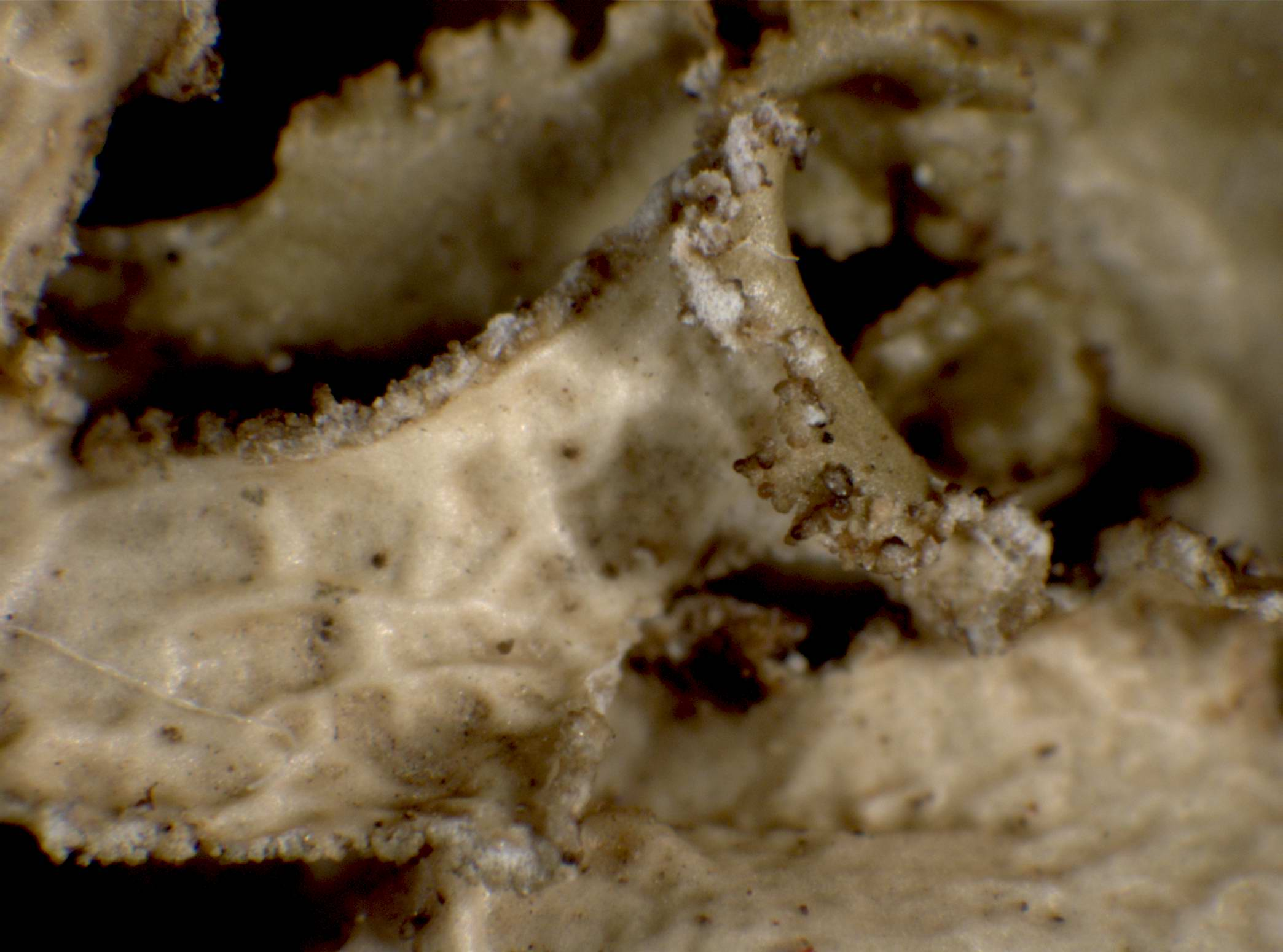
Underside of a thallus lobe, showing pale brown colouring, wrinkles, and marginal soredia.

Tuckermannopsis chlorophylla is a small, leaf-like (foliose) lichen forming loose tufts 1–6 cm across, only occasionally making a neat rosette. Its lobes are few to many, typically 1–3 cm long and 0.2–1 cm wide. They are shallowly channelled like a trough, with wavy, crinkled, or notched edges, and are often deeply cut; the lobes stand up from the substrate or lift along the margins rather than lying flat. The upper surface is pale to medium brown in dry weather, turning olive-green and slightly translucent when wet. Tiny pores (pseudocyphellae) are absent. Instead, powdery reproductive granules called soredia are frequent and sit along the lobe edges; these are grey-white and serve as the main means of spread. The underside is white to pale brown—paling toward the centre—wrinkled, and bears few of the root-like fasteners (rhizines); these, when present, are whitish. The photobiont partner is a green algal species in the Trebouxia implex/Trebouxia suecica species group.

Sexual structures are uncommon. When present, the cup-like fruiting bodies (apothecia) sit directly on the thallus (sessile), with discs up to 3 mm across and a rim (thalline margin) that is itself dusted with soredia. Microscopy shows club-shaped asci 30–40 × 7–10 μm, with straight, sparsely branched paraphyses that have swollen tips; the ascospores are spherical, about 5 μm in diameter. Asexual spore-bearing structures (pycnidia) are sparse, occur along the margins, and protrude slightly; they produce dumbbell-shaped conidia 5–6 × about 1.5 μm. Standard chemical spot tests on the inner layer (medulla) are negative (C−, K−, KC−, Pd−) and there is no fluorescence under UV light; the major secondary metabolite detected is protolichesterinic acid.

== Habitat and distribution ==
Tuckermannopsis chlorophylla is described as having either a circumpolar distribution, or a cosmopolitan distribution, as it occurs on at least four continents and many oceanic islands. It grows on the bark of trees and shrubs in forests and along roadsides, as well as on wooden fence posts. Other more rarely reported substrates include coarse-grained siliceous rocks and stone monuments. In northern North America, it is common in western conifer forests along the Pacific Coast north to Alaska. In Mexico, it is only known to occur from historical collections made in Baja California. Its distribution also includes South Africa, South America (Argentina, Chile, Falkland Islands), Australia, and New Zealand.

== Species interactions ==
Tremella cetrariicola is a widespread lichenicolous (lichen-dwelling) fungus that uses Tuckermannopsis chlorophylla as a host.
