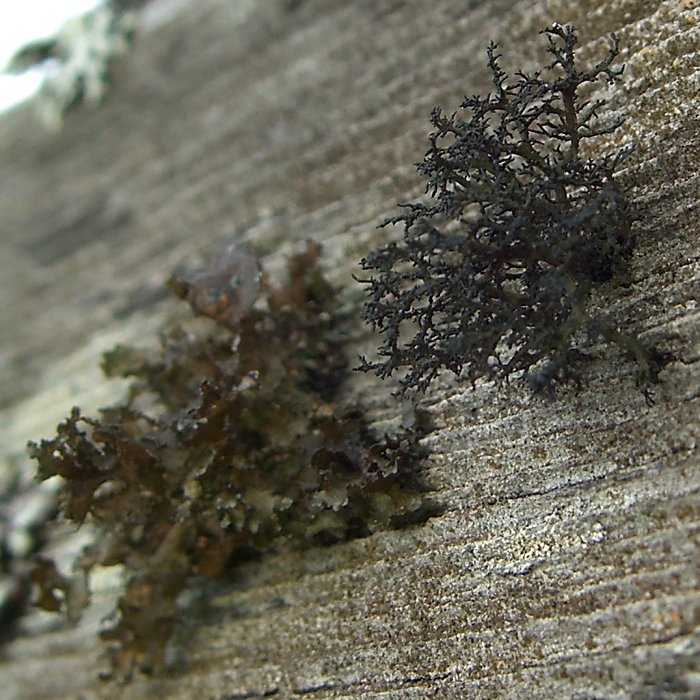
- Kaernefeltia californica (right)

Scientific classification
- Kingdom: Fungi
- Division: Ascomycota
- Class: Lecanoromycetes
- Order: Lecanorales
- Family: Parmeliaceae
- Genus: Kaernefeltia; A.Thell & Goward (1996)

Type species
- Kaernefeltia californica (Tuck.) A.Thell & Goward (1996)

Species
- K. californica K. merrillii

= Kaernefeltia =

Genus of lichen-forming fungi

Kaernefeltia is a small genus of lichen-forming fungi in the family Parmeliaceae. These lichens are distinguished from related groups by their club-shaped spore sacs, disc-bar-shaped pycnoconidia (asexual spores), and the presence of lichesterinic and protolichesterinic acids. The genus comprises two species that grow on conifer trees in western North America.

== Taxonomy ==
Kaernefeltia was circumscribed by the lichenologists Arne Thell and Trevor Goward in 1996 to accommodate two western North American species that had previously been classified as Cetraria californica (the type species) and C. merrillii. The genus name honours Swedish lichenologist Ingvar Kärnefelt. Thell and Goward established Kaernefeltia to distinguish these two species from Cetraria (in the strict sense), Tuckermannopsis, and Cornicularia. Their decision was based on several shared characters: the broadly clavate asci with a small tholus and broad axial body, slightly capitate paraphyses (i.e., with swollen tips), disc-bar-shaped pycnoconidia, and a distinctive chemistry featuring lichesterinic and protolichesterinic acids along with other fatty acids with low Rf values in thin-layer chromatography. These features, combined with their cortical structure and apothecial anatomy, group merrillii and californica together as a coherent unit that is clearly separate from the core cetrarioid lichens and from Tuckermannopsis (which has globose spores and dumb-bell-shaped pycnoconidia).

In 2017, Divakar and colleagues used a then recently developed "temporal phylogenetic" approach to identify temporal bands corresponding to specific taxonomic ranks in the family Parmeliaceae, suggesting that groups of species that diverged within the time window of 29.45–32.55 million years ago represent genera. They proposed to synonymize Kaernefeltia with Nephromopsis, along with several other Parmelioid genera, so that all the genera within the Parmeliaceae are about the same age. Although some of their proposed taxonomic changes were accepted, the synonymisation of the Parmelioid genera with Nephromopsis was not accepted in a later critical review of the temporal phylogenetic approach for rank-based fungal classification.

== Description ==
Kaernefeltia species grow primarily on conifer trees. These lichens can appear either leaf-like (foliose) or shrubby (fruticose) in growth form, typically reaching up to 1.5 cm in height. The main body (thallus) of Kaernefeltia ranges in colour from pale olive-brown to greenish-black, often appearing paler in the centre. The branches or lobes can be either smooth or covered with small bumps and ridges, and sometimes have a whitish, powdery coating (pruina). The outer protective layer (cortex) has a distinctive structure that can be either single- or double-layered, with the inner layer composed of specially arranged fungal cells.

Kaernefeltia reproduces both sexually and asexually. The sexual reproductive structures (apothecia) are commonly found on these lichens, appearing as dark brown or blackish discs that can be located along the edges or surface of the thallus. These structures contain spore-producing cells (asci) that are club-shaped and produce eight spores each.

== Species ==
- Kaernefeltia californica (Tuck.) A.Thell & Goward (1996)
- Kaernefeltia iberica (A.Crespo & Barreno) A.Crespo & Barreno (2016)
- Kaernefeltia merrillii (Du Rietz) A.Thell & Goward (1996)

Kaernefeltia iberica was published invalidly, as it lacked a citation of an identifier from a registration depository. Thell and Goward consider it to fall within the range of variation of Kaernefeltia merrillii, and essentially conspecific.
