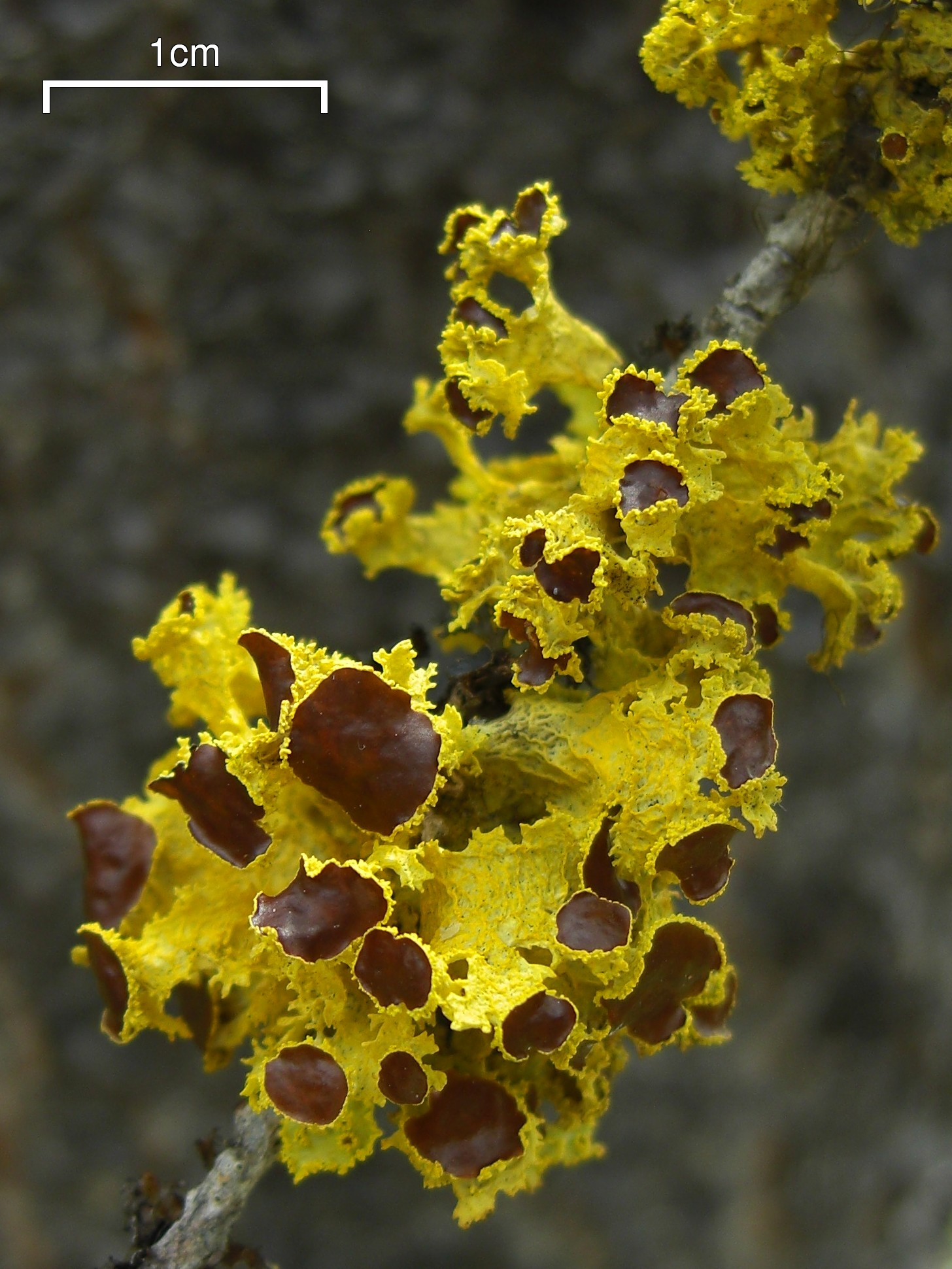

Conservation status
- Secure (NatureServe)

Scientific classification
- Kingdom: Fungi
- Division: Ascomycota
- Class: Lecanoromycetes
- Order: Lecanorales
- Family: Parmeliaceae
- Genus: Vulpicida
- Species: V. canadensis

Binomial name
- Vulpicida canadensis (Räsänen) J.-E.Mattsson & M.J.Lai (1993)

Synonyms
- Cetraria juniperina var. canadensis Räsänen (1933); Cetraria canadensis (Räsänen) Räsänen (1952); Tuckermannopsis canadensis (Räsänen) Hale (1987)

= Vulpicida canadensis =

Species of lichen

Vulpicida canadensis, the brown-eyed sunshine lichen, is a species of foliose lichen in the family Parmeliaceae. It is endemic to northwestern North America where it grows as an epiphyte on the bark and wood of conifer trees.

== Taxonomy ==
The lichen was first formally described in 1933 by the Finnish lichenologist Veli Räsänen; he named it as a variety of Cetraria juniperina (now Vulpicida juniperinus). Räsänen distinguished his new variety from typical C. juniperina by several features: its erect thallus with obtuse lobes, bright golden-yellow colour, reticulate-veined upper surface, and smaller (1–3 mm wide), terminal apothecia. He noted it was very common on conifer twigs in British Columbia, where he observed it at several locations including Kamloops and Hazelton.

Räsänen promoted the taxon to species status in 1952, as Cetraria canadensis. Mason Hale suggested classifying the species in genus Tuckermannopsis in 1987. In 1993, it was transferred to the newly created genus Vulpicida by Mattsson and Lai, along with five other species previously classified in Cetraria.

Molecular phylogenetics studies published in 2014 confirmed V. canadensis as a distinct species within Vulpicida. The research, which analyzed five DNA loci, showed that V. canadensis forms monophyletic clades in all phylogenetic trees, indicating clear genetic separation from other species in the genus. It is most closely related to V. viridis, the other North American species in the genus, though they have non-overlapping geographic distributions.

Unlike some other species pairs in the genus that showed evidence of incomplete lineage sorting or hybridization, V. canadensis maintains clear species boundaries. This genetic distinctiveness, combined with its unique morphological characteristics and restricted western North American distribution, strongly supports its status as a separate species.

== Description ==
Vulpicida canadensis has a foliose thallus with an intense yellow colour. It produces apothecia (reproductive structures) commonly. The pycnidia (asexual reproductive structures) are immersed in the thallus and produce lemon-shaped (citriform) pycnoconidia. Like other Vulpicida species, it contains usnic acid in the cortex and vulpinic and pinastric acids in the medulla, which give the thallus its characteristic yellow colouration.

Because of similarities in colour, Vulpicida canadensis could be confused with Letharia columbiana, but this species is fruticose and has a white medulla.

== Habitat and distribution ==
Vulpicida canadensis is endemic to northwestern North America where it grows as an epiphyte on the bark and wood of conifer trees. It often co-occurs with horsehair lichen (genus Bryoria).
