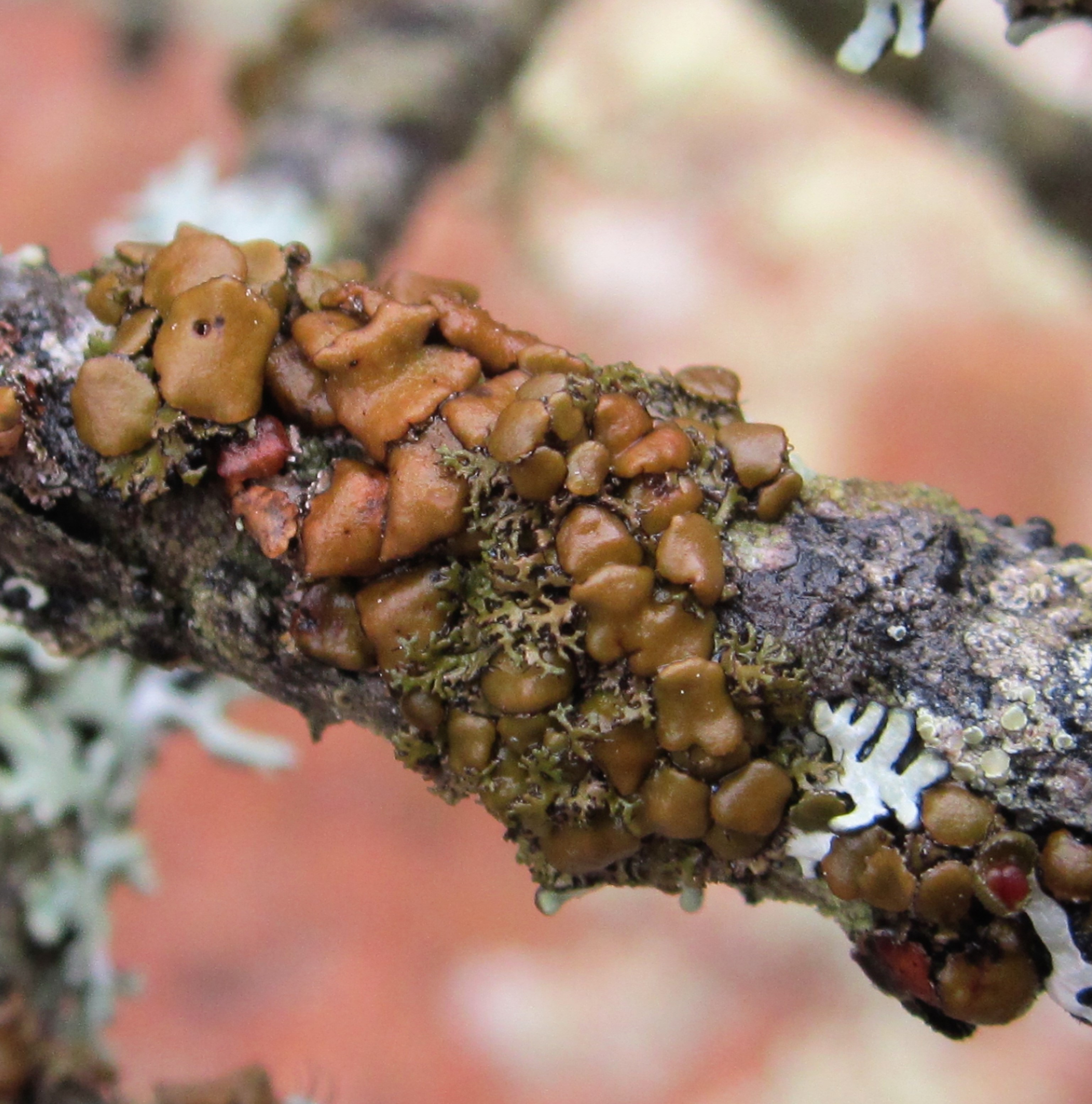
- Tuckermanella fendleri

Scientific classification
- Kingdom: Fungi
- Division: Ascomycota
- Class: Lecanoromycetes
- Order: Lecanorales
- Family: Parmeliaceae
- Genus: Tuckermanella; Essl. (2003)

Type species
- Tuckermanella weberi (Essl.) Essl. (2003)

Species
- T. arizonica T. coralligera T. fendleri T. pseudoweberi T. rickieae T. subfendleri T. weberi

= Tuckermanella =

Genus of fungi

Tuckermanella is a genus of lichen-forming fungi in the family Parmeliaceae.

== Taxonomy ==
The genus was circumscribed in 2003 by lichenologist Ted Essingler to contain cetrarioid lichens previously placed in the "Cetraria fendleri" species group. The genus names honors the American lichenologist Edward Tuckerman.

In 2017, Pradeep Divakar and colleagues used a then-recently developed "temporal phylogenetic" approach to identify temporal bands for specific taxonomic ranks in the family Parmeliaceae, suggesting that groups of species that diverged within the time window of 29.45–32.55 million years ago represent genera. They proposed to synonymize Tuckermanella with Nephromopsis, along with several other Parmelioid genera, so that all the genera within the Parmeliaceae are about the same age. Although some of their proposed taxonomic changes were accepted, the synonymization of the Parmelioid genera with Nephromopsis was not accepted in a later critical analysis of the temporal phylogenetic approach for fungal classification.

== Description ==
Tuckermanella lichens have small- to medium-sized foliose (leafy) thalli, and are generally brown to blackish-green in colour. They have continuous pseudocyphellae (tiny pores that allow gas exchange) on the margins of their lobes. Tuckermannopsis and Melanohalea are similar in appearance, although species in those genera are typically larger and lack the continuous marginal pseudocyphellae.

== Species ==
- Tuckermanella arizonica Essl. 2003)
- Tuckermanella coralligera (W.A.Weber) Essl. (2003)
- Tuckermanella fendleri (Nyl.) Essl. (2003)
- Tuckermanella pseudoweberi Essl. (2003)
- Tuckermanella rickieae Essl. (2016) – Mexico
- Tuckermanella subfendleri (Essl.) Essl. (2003)
- Tuckermanella weberi (Essl.) Essl. (2003)
