= Cetraria platyphylla =

Conservation status
- Secure (NatureServe)

Scientific classification
- Kingdom: Fungi
- Division: Ascomycota
- Class: Lecanoromycetes
- Order: Lecanorales
- Family: Parmeliaceae
- Genus: Cetraria
- Species: C. platyphylla

Binomial name
- Cetraria platyphylla Tuck. (1882)

Synonyms
- Tuckermannopsis platyphylla (Tuck.) Gyeln. (1934)

Species of lichen-forming fungus

Cetraria platyphylla is a species of foliose lichen in the family Parmeliaceae. It was first described by the American lichenologist Edward Tuckerman in 1882, from specimens collected in British Columbia, Canada. The lichen is characterized by its leaf-like, olivaceous-brown lobes that typically grow 4–12 millimeters wide, with a lower surface that matches the upper surface in color. In the Pacific Northwest, it grows mainly as an epiphyte on the bark of conifer trees, most commonly found high in tree crowns in moist forests from low elevations up to near the tree line.

== Taxonomy ==
Cetraria platyphylla was first described by the American lichenologist Edward Tuckerman in 1882. In his original description, Tuckerman characterized the species as having a cartilaginous (firm and flexible), rigid thallus that is foliaceous (leaf-like) and sub-monophyllous (consisting of few lobes). He noted its olivaceous-brown coloration and distinctive paler underside with reduced or absent fibrils. The type specimen was collected by John Macoun from trees in British Columbia at Lake Stewart. In his protologue, Tuckerman also referenced specimens from Yosemite Valley, California. Tuckerman noted that while the thallus is typically pale sulfur-colored within, this characteristic is not always consistent. He compared the species to Sticta fuliginosa in terms of general appearance, but noted it was closer to Cetraria ciliaris, from which it differs primarily in spore characteristics. Tuckerman distinguished the Pacific coast specimens from the originally described eastern North American C. ciliaris, noting that the Pacific form may be smaller and does not always possess the fibrils that characterize the eastern populations, though they are not always absent either.

In 1934, Vilmos Kőfaragó-Gyelnik reclassified the species in the genus Tuckermannopsis. As of 2013, Tuckermannopsis platyphylla was considered one of several cetrarioid lichens whose generic position is considered unsatisfactory according to modern molecular phylogenetics analysis, but had not yet been placed in any other genus. In their 2023 edition of Macrolichens of the Pacific Northwest, authors Bruce McCune and Linda Geiser took a pragmatic approach to the taxonomic confusion surrounding the numerous cetrarioid segregate genera by treating Cetraria in the broad sense, including Cetraria platyphylla.

== Description ==
Cetraria platyphylla is characterized by lobes that typically measure 4–12 mm wide when mature. The lower surface is generally the same color as the upper surface, which is olivaceous-brown. Apothecia (fruiting bodies) are often present but rarely cover or dominate the lobes. The medulla (inner tissue layer) is frequently pale yellow near the apothecia and reacts K+ (yellowish), a useful chemical spot test for identification.

== Habitat and distribution ==
In the Pacific Northwest, Cetraria platyphylla grows as an epiphyte on bark and weathered wood, primarily of conifers. It is most often found high in the crowns of trees in low-elevation moist forests, but it also occurs in drier interior forests and on open-grown trees, extending upward to near the tree line.

McCune and Geiser record the species from British Columbia south through Washington and Oregon into California, and inland to Alberta and Montana. Within this range it is mainly an interior species, most frequent between the crest of the Cascade Range and the Rocky Mountains, with only scattered occurrences west of the Cascades.
