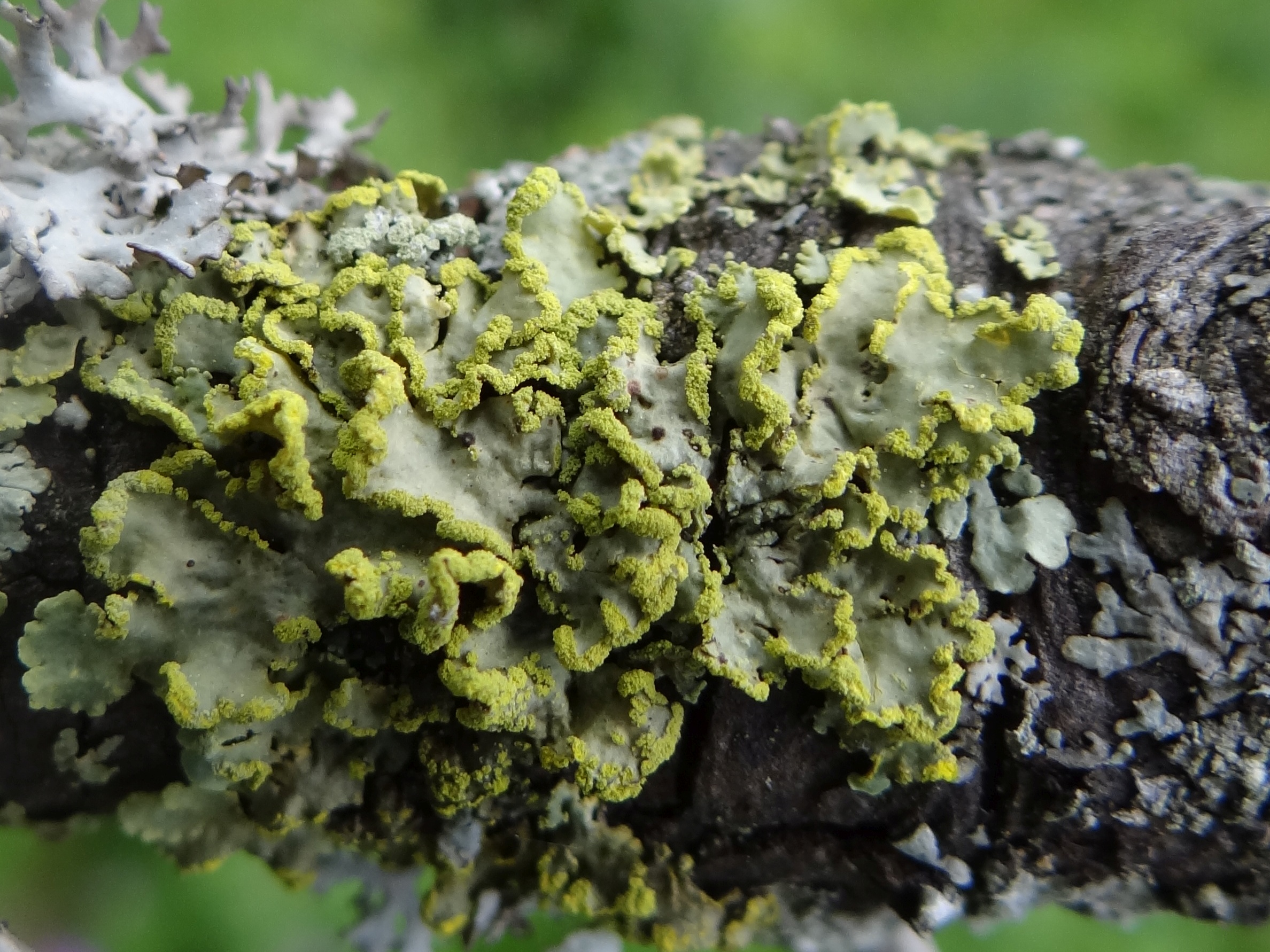

Conservation status
- Secure (NatureServe)

Scientific classification
- Kingdom: Fungi
- Division: Ascomycota
- Class: Lecanoromycetes
- Order: Lecanorales
- Family: Parmeliaceae
- Genus: Vulpicida
- Species: V. pinastri

Binomial name
- Vulpicida pinastri (Scop.) J.-E.Mattsson & M.J.Lai (1993)

Synonyms
- Lichen pinastri Scop. (1772)

= Vulpicida pinastri =

Species of lichen in the family Parmeliaceae

Vulpicida pinastri, the powdered sunshine, is a species of foliose lichen in the family Parmeliaceae. The lichen has a greenish-yellow thallus and dorsiventral lobes. It grows on conifers and Betula in North America and Eurasia. It is the only sorediate species in the genus and is distinguished by the bright-yellow marginal soralia. The lichen, originally described by Italian naturalist Giovanni Antonio Scopoli in 1772, was transferred to the newly circumscribed genus Vulpicida by Jan-Eric Mattson and Ming-Jou Lai in 1993.

In Iceland, V. pinastri grows on downy birch stems and branches. It is found in only a few locations in the Eastern Region and is locally classified as an endangered species (EN).
