= Xanthoparmelia olivetorica =

Scientific classification
- Kingdom: Fungi
- Division: Ascomycota
- Class: Lecanoromycetes
- Order: Lecanorales
- Family: Parmeliaceae
- Genus: Xanthoparmelia
- Species: X. olivetorica

Binomial name
- Xanthoparmelia olivetorica Hale (1986)

Species of lichen

Xanthoparmelia olivetorica is a species of saxicolous (rock-dwelling), foliose lichen in the family Parmeliaceae. Found in Southern Africa, it was formally described as a new species in 1986 by the American lichenologist Mason Hale. The type specimen was collected from the Table Mountain Nature Reserve (Cape Province), where it was found growing on sheltered sandstone ledges. The lichen thallus is tightly attached to its rock substrate, dark greenish-yellow in color (darkening towards the center), and measures 1–3 cm (0.4–1.2 in) broad. It has a shiny black undersurface with sparse black rhizines that are about 0.2 mm long. The lichen contains olivetoric acid (for which it is named) and usnic acid.

== See also ==
- List of Xanthoparmelia species
