= Olivetoric acid =

Chemical compound found in some lichens

Names
- IUPAC name 4-[2,4-dihydroxy-6-(2-oxoheptyl)benzoyl]oxy-2-hydroxy-6-pentylbenzoic acid
- Other names Olivetoric acid

Identifiers
CAS Number	491-47-4
3D model (JSmol)	Interactive image
ChEBI	CHEBI:144183
ChEMBL	ChEMBL3770253
ChemSpider	513972
PubChem CID	591238
CompTox Dashboard (EPA)	DTXSID101316863
- InChI: InChI=1S/C26H32O8/c1-3-5-7-9-16-13-20(15-22(30)23(16)25(31)32)34-26(33)24-17(12-19(28)14-21(24)29)11-18(27)10-8-6-4-2/h12-15,28-30H,3-11H2,1-2H3,(H,31,32) Key: VZPLPGICHZXOCQ-UHFFFAOYSA-N
- SMILES: CCCCCC1=C(C(=CC(=C1)OC(=O)C2=C(C=C(C=C2O)O)CC(=O)CCCCC)O)C(=O)O

Properties
Chemical formula	C_{26}H_{32}O_{8}
Molar mass	472.534 g·mol^{−1}
Melting point	151 °C (304 °F; 424 K)
- Except where otherwise noted, data are given for materials in their standard state (at 25 °C [77 °F], 100 kPa). Infobox references

Olivetoric acid is an organic compound belonging to the chemical class known as depsides. A secondary metabolite of various lichen species, it has been investigated for its various biological activities.

== Properties ==
Olivetoric acid is a member of the class of chemical compounds called depsides. Its IUPAC name is 4-[2,4-dihydroxy-6-(2-oxoheptyl)benzoyl]oxy-2-hydroxy-6-pentylbenzoic acid. The ultraviolet absorbance maxima (λ_{max}) has two peaks at 270 and 305 nm. In the infrared spectrum, significant peaks indicative of the carboxylic acid functional group occur at 1250 cm^{−1} (C-O stretching), at 1620 cm^{−1} (aromatic C=C stretching), 1650 cm^{−1} and 1690 cm^{−1} (C=O stretching of carboxylic acid and ketone), 3150 cm^{−1} (aromatic C-H stretching), and 3400 cm^{−1} (OH stretching of phenolic and carboxylic acid groups). Confluentic acid's molecular formula is C_{26}H_{32}O_{8}; it has a molecular mass of 346.32 grams per mole. In its purified form, it exists as thin curved needles with a melting point of 151 °C (304 °F). Several chemical tests can be used to identify olivetoric acid: it reacts with sodium hypochlorite to produce a red colour and with iron(III) chloride to make a purple colour. Additionally, when treated with a saturated solution of barium peroxide (BaO_{2}), it initially turns yellow before transitioning to green after several minutes.

== Occurrence ==
Olivetoric acid occurs naturally in several lichen species, notably in Cladonia stellaris (Northern reindeer lichen), where it exists alongside other lichen acids including usnic acid and perlatolic acid. In C. stellaris, olivetoric acid is typically present in its methyl ester form and other olivetoric acid-type derivatives. These compounds can be detected through high-performance liquid chromatography with ultraviolet and mass spectrometric detection, as well as gas chromatography with flame ionization (GC-FID) and mass spectrometric detection. Chromatographic analysis has revealed that olivetoric acid-type compounds in C. stellaris can include 4-O-methylolivetoric acid, olivetoric acid methyl ester, and various other structurally related derivatives. Other lichens known to contain olivetoric acid include Tuckermannopsis ciliaris, Pseudevernia furfuracea, and Cetrelia olivetorum. The South African foliose lichen species Xanthoparmelia olivetorica is named for the presence of olivetoric acid.

== Synthesis ==
The first total synthesis of olivetoric acid was reported in 1978 by Jack Elix and Brian Ferguson at the Australian National University. The key challenge in synthesizing olivetoric acid and related compounds was managing the reactive benzyl ketone substituent positioned near the depside ester group. Their successful approach involved direct condensation of appropriately protected aromatic precursors using dicyclohexylcarbodiimide. Specifically, they protected potentially reactive phenol and carboxyl groups through O-benzylation and converted the benzyl ketone to a 1,3-dithiane. The synthesis utilised 2,4-dibenzyloxy-6-[(2'-pentyl-1',3'-dithian-2'-yl)methyl]benzoic acid as a key intermediate. After condensation to form the depside linkage, the protecting groups were removed using copper(II) chloride/copper(II) oxide in acetone followed by hydrogenolysis over palladised carbon to yield olivetoric acid with physical and spectral properties matching those of the natural product.

== Bioactivity ==
Olivetoric acid has been investigated for its various biological activities, including anti-angiogenic, anticancer, and antimicrobial activities.
