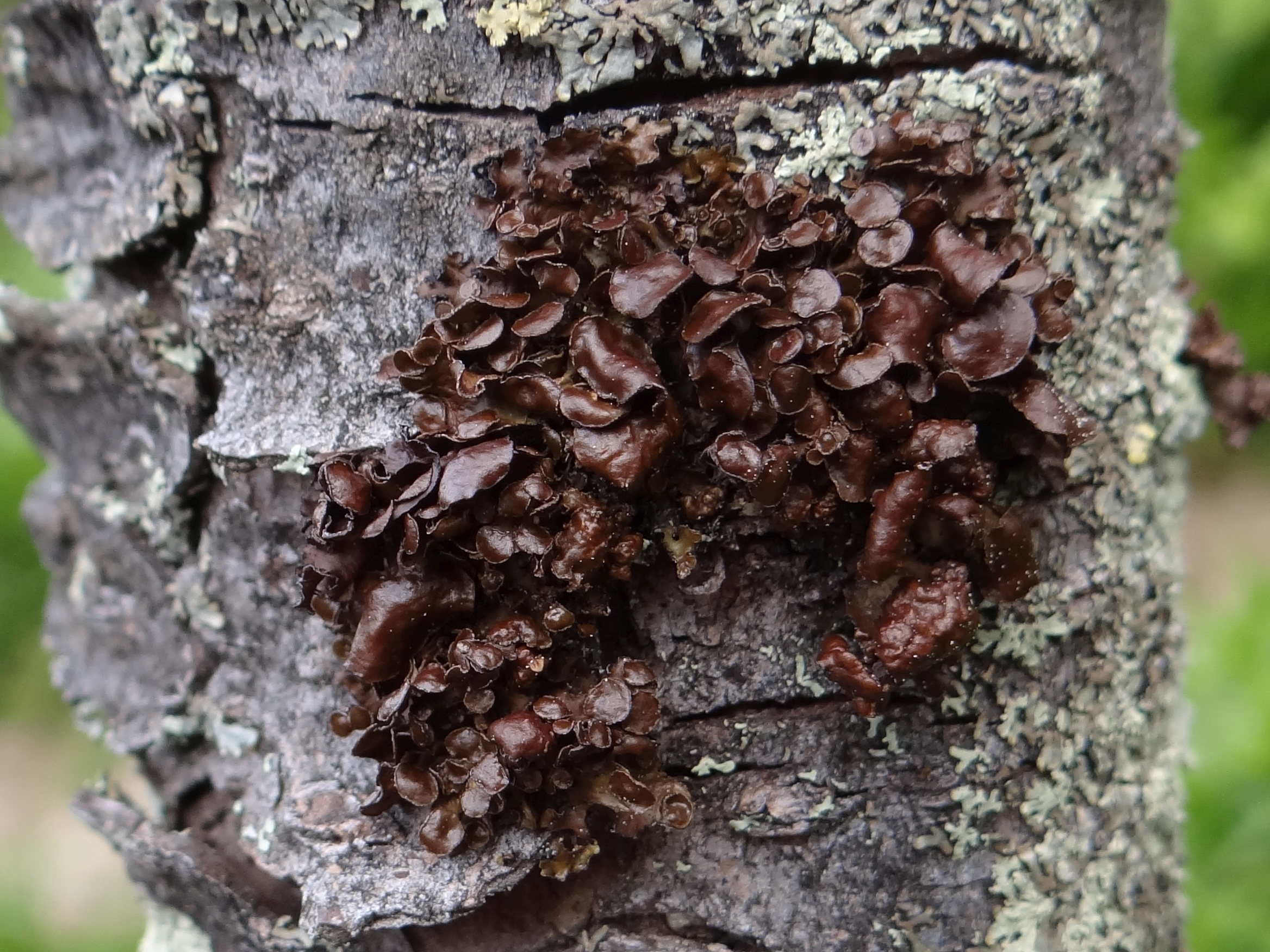

Conservation status
- Secure (NatureServe)

Scientific classification
- Kingdom: Fungi
- Division: Ascomycota
- Class: Lecanoromycetes
- Order: Lecanorales
- Family: Parmeliaceae
- Genus: Cetraria
- Species: C. sepincola

Binomial name
- Cetraria sepincola (Ehrh.) Ach. (1803)

Synonyms
- List: Lichen sepincola Ehrh. [as 'saepincola'], (1783); Platysma sepincola (Ehrh.) Hoffm. [as 'saepincolum'] (1790); Platisma sepincola (Ehrh.) Hoffm. (1790); Lobaria sepincola (Ehrh.) Hoffm. [as 'saepincola'] (1796); Physcia sepincola (Ehrh.) DC. (1805); Parmelia sepincola (Ehrh.) Sommerf. (1826); Parmelia olivacea f. polycarpa Flot. (1828); Tuckermannopsis sepincola (Ehrh.) Hale (1987); Cetraria sepincola var. ulophylla Ach. (1803); Cetraria ulophylla (Ach.) Rebent. (1804); Lichen sepincola var. ulophyllus (Ach.) Wahlenb. (1812); Lichen sepincola var. ulophyllum (Ach.) Wahlenb. (1812); Lichen sepincola * ulophylla (Ach.) Lam. (1813); Parmelia sepincola var. ulophylla (Ach.) Sommerf. (1826); Physcia sepincola var. ulophylla (Ach.) Duby (1830); Platysma sepincola var. ulophyllum (Ach.) Nyl. (1857); Platysma ulophyllum (Ach.) Nyl. (1861); Cetraria chlorophylla var. ulophylla (Ach.) Maas Geest. (1948)

= Cetraria sepincola =

Species of lichen

Cetraria sepincola, the chestnut wrinkle-lichen, is a species of foliose lichen in the family Parmeliaceae. It forms compact, cushion-like colonies typically 0.5–2 cm (1/4–3/4 in) high, with a yellowish-green to dark brown upper surface and lighter underside. The species has a primarily circumboreal distribution and is widespread in northern regions, occurring from Alaska to northern California in North America and documented as far south as Argentina. While mainly found growing on woody species like Betula, Sorbus, Salix, and Alnus in bog environments and open areas, it can occasionally be found on dead wood and rarely on rock surfaces. Originally described by Jakob Friedrich Ehrhart in 1783 as Lichen sepincola, it was transferred to the genus Cetraria by Erik Acharius in 1803.

== Taxonomy ==
It was originally described in 1783 by Jakob Friedrich Ehrhart, who classified it as a member of the eponymous genus Lichen, following the standard placement for these organisms at the time; the original spelling of the species epithet was saepincola. The Swedish "Father of Lichenology", Erik Acharius, transferred it to the genus Cetraria in 1803. It is one of eight species originally included in the genus. Mason Hale transferred the taxon to the genus Tuckermannopsis in 1987, and it is often considered a member of that genus in lichenological literature published in the following couple of decades. Early molecular phylogenetics analyses (2002) suggested that the true taxonomic placement of Cetraria sepincola was uncertain, and even a decade later it was referred to as an "orphaned species".

English vernacular names that have been used for this species include "chestnut wrinkle-lichen", "eyed ruffle", and "chocolate shield".

== Description ==
Cetraria sepincola forms compact, cushion-like colonies that are typically 0.5–2 cm (1/4–3/4 in) high. The thallus, or body, is mostly single-layered and erect, consisting of lobes that are rounded and either flat or slightly grooved. These lobes branch out in a shallow, forked pattern.

The upper surface of the thallus varies in colour, ranging from yellowish-green to reddish-brown or even dark brown, and it often has a wrinkled and glossy texture. The underside is lighter, transitioning from pale brown near the centre to almost white towards the edges, and it also has a wrinkled appearance. Sparse root-like structures called rhizines can be found on the lower surface, though they are few, and fine hair-like cilia are rarely present. The lichen lacks soredia, which are powdery reproductive structures used for dispersal.

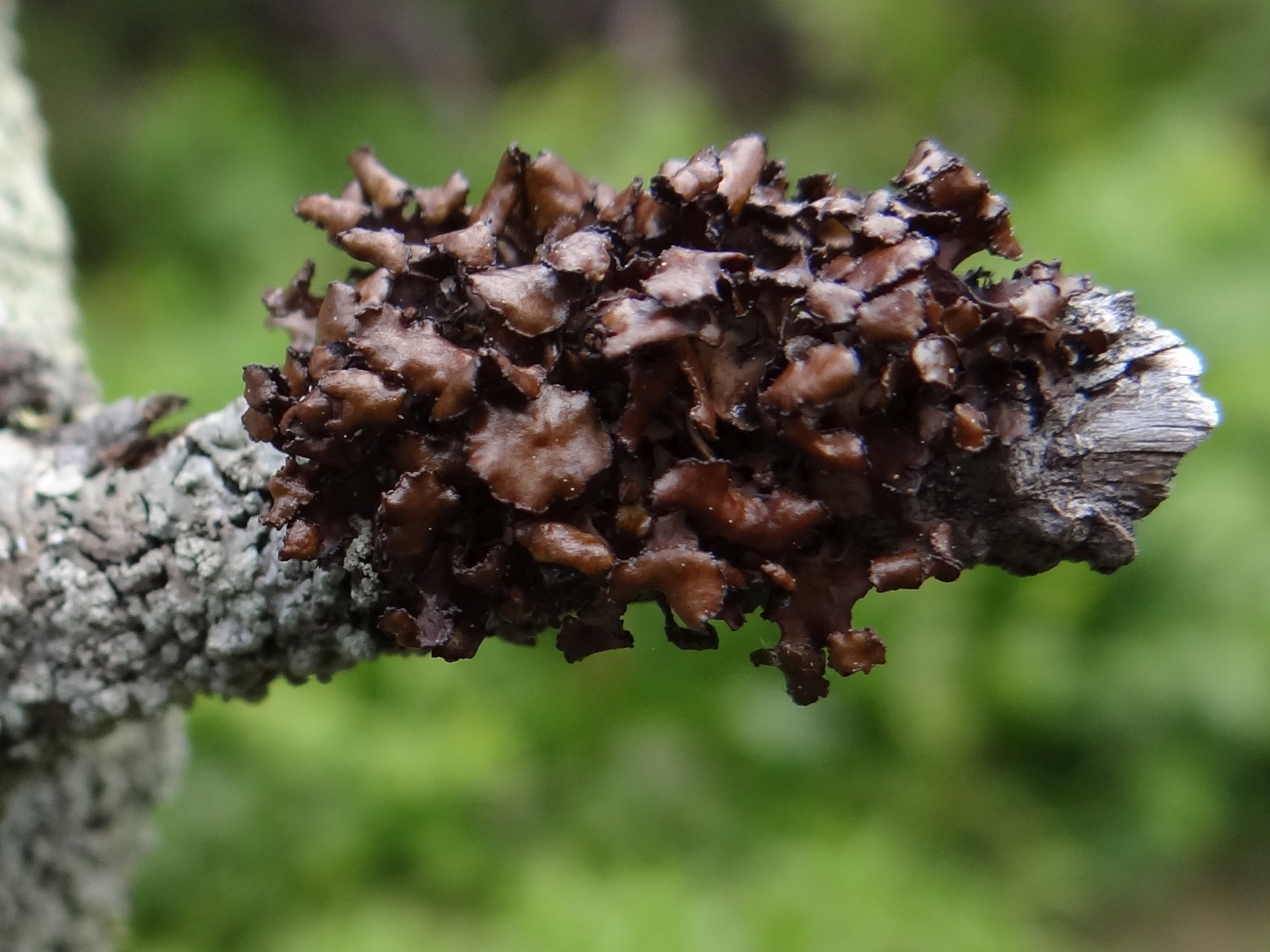
Growing on dwarf mountain pine (Pinus mugo) in Slovakia

One distinguishing feature is the presence of small, pale spots called pseudocyphellae, which are mainly concentrated near the edges of the reproductive structures (apothecia). The apothecia are common, occurring along the edges or at the tips of the lobes, and can reach up to 8 mm (3/8 in) in diameter. They are disk-shaped and match the colour of the thallus.

Microscopically, C. sepincola produces elliptical spores that measure 6–10 by 3–6 μm. Another feature is the presence of tiny black structures called pycnidia along the margins of the lobes; these are slightly raised and typically empty. The lichen's conidia (spores produced asexually) are shaped like dumbbells and measure 5–7 by 1 μm.

Cetraria sepincola contains lichesterinic acid and protolichesterinic acid as characteristic secondary metabolites (lichen products). These substances are fatty acids and are non-reactive with any of the standard chemical spot tests used in lichen identification.

== Habitat and distribution ==
Cetraria sepincola has a primarily circumboreal distribution, though it also occurs in the Alps. The species is widespread throughout northern North America, particularly in the Pacific Northwest where it ranges from Alaska south to northern California and northwest Montana. Outside of North America, it has been documented as far south as Argentina. It is common in Fennoscandia and Iceland, but less frequent as the European distribution extends south. In the Polish Regional Red List, it has been placed in the endangered category.

The species is uncommon in Arctic and temperate regions. It typically grows on tree twigs and shrubs in open areas, showing a particular affinity for bog environments. While primarily found on woody species like Betula, Sorbus, Salix, and Alnus, it can occasionally be found growing on dead wood (lignicolous) and rarely on rock surfaces (saxicolous). Unlike other epiphytic lichens in its range, C. sepincola shows no distinct vertical zonation in relation to snow cover, occurring both above and below snow levels. It is frequently found growing on small twigs and branches rather than main tree trunks.

In south-west Germany, near the south-western margin of its Central European range, C. sepincola survives in small, fragmented populations in cool, open microhabitats such as bog margins, montane stone fields, and wooded meadows. There it grows mainly on old twigs of Betula pubescens, especially on exposed branches at the edge of the tree crown, rather than on shaded trunks. A 2026 study of these marginal populations found that the species was most abundant at sites with low background ammonia concentrations, while higher ammonia levels and less acidic bark were associated with poorer populations or local disappearance. The authors also found that the lichen associates with a narrow range of Trebouxia photobionts, and suggested that nitrogen enrichment may further disadvantage the species by favouring nitrophytic lichens and altering the local pool of compatible algal partners needed for establishment.
