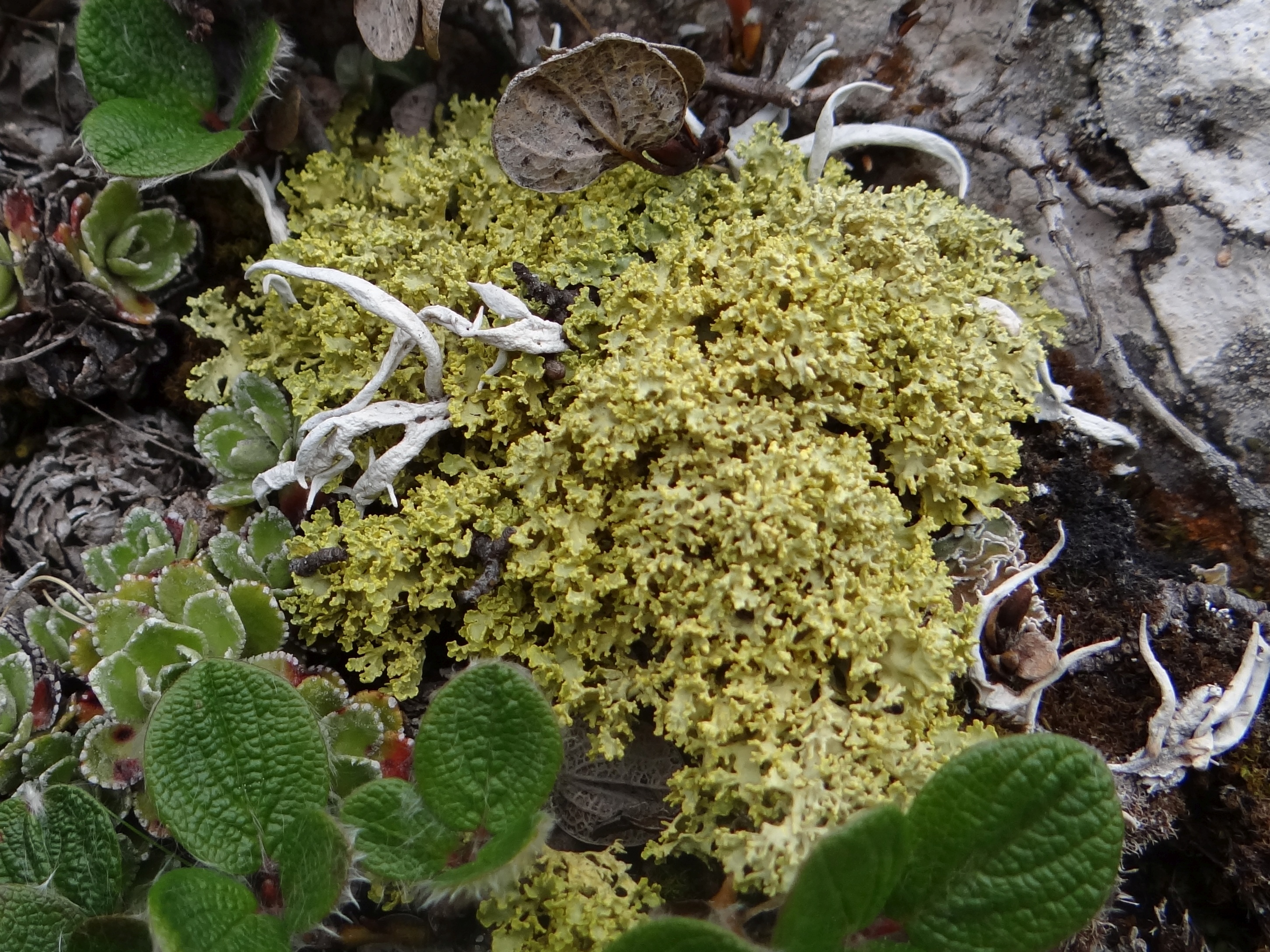

Conservation status
- Secure (NatureServe)

Scientific classification
- Kingdom: Fungi
- Division: Ascomycota
- Class: Lecanoromycetes
- Order: Lecanorales
- Family: Parmeliaceae
- Genus: Vulpicida
- Species: V. juniperinus

Binomial name
- Vulpicida juniperinus (L.) J.-E.Mattsson & M.J.Lai (1993)

= Vulpicida juniperinus =

Species of lichen-forming fungus

Vulpicida juniperinus is a species of lichen found in the Northern Hemisphere, commonly known as rock sunshine lichen or yellow rock lichen. This species is characterized by its bright yellow, coral-like growth form on exposed ground, often in Arctic or alpine areas.

Previously thought to be three distinct species, V. juniperinus is now thought of as a single species or a species complex, composed of what used to be V. juniperinus, V. tilesii, and V. tubulosis.

== See also ==
- List of lichens named by Carl Linnaeus
