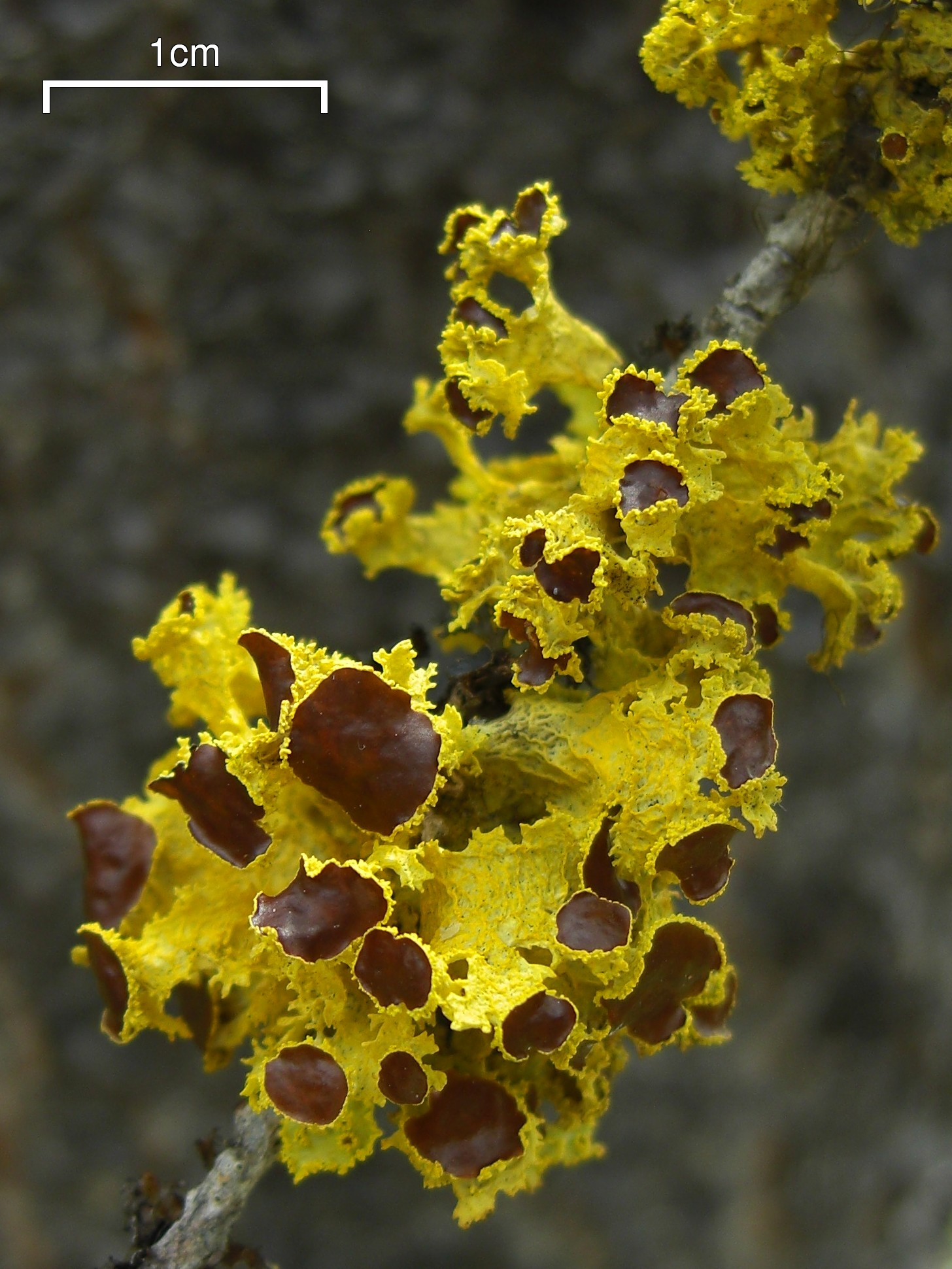
- Vulpicida canadensis

Scientific classification
- Kingdom: Fungi
- Division: Ascomycota
- Class: Lecanoromycetes
- Order: Lecanorales
- Family: Parmeliaceae
- Genus: Vulpicida; Mattsson & M.J.Lai (1993)

Type species
- Vulpicida juniperinus (L.) J.-E.Mattsson & M.J.Lai (1993)

Species
- V. canadensis V. juniperinus V. pinastri V. viridis

= Vulpicida =

Genus of lichen

Vulpicida is a genus of lichenized fungi in the family Parmeliaceae. Circumscribed in 1993 to contain species formerly placed in Cetraria, the genus is widespread in Arctic to northern temperate regions, and contains six species. The genus is characterized by the presence of the secondary metabolites pulvinic acid and vulpinic acid, compounds that when combined with usnic acid, give the species their characteristic yellow and green colors.

== Taxonomy ==
The genus was circumscribed by Jan-Eric Mattson and Ming-Jou Lai in a 1993 Mycotaxon publication, to contain yellow species containing vulpinic and pinastric acids and a broadly club-shaped ascus. Mattson published a monograph of the genus later that year. The group of species assigned to the genus were previously recognized as a distinct grouping by Finnish lichenologist Veli Räsänen in 1952, who classified them in the genus Cetraria, subgenus Platysma, section Flavidae, and subsection Cucullatae. The type species is Vulpicida juniperinus, originally Lichen juniperinus as described by Carl Linnaeus in the second volume of his 1753 Species Plantarum.

The generic name Vulpicida is derived from the Latin words vulpes ("fox") and -cida ("who kills"); according to Swedish peasant folklore, the lichen, when consumed, kills foxes but not dogs or wolves.

According to a 2009 molecular analysis using internal transcribed spacer data from five of the six known species, Vulpicida is supported as monophyletic (descended from a common evolutionary ancestor) when using Bayesian analysis. Using a different method for phylogenetic inference, PAUP (phylogenetic analysis using parsimony), the genus is paraphyletic, as Allocetraria nests within the same clade.

== Description ==
The thallus (the vegetative body of the lichen) ranges in form from foliose ("leaf-like", with distinctly formed lobes) and forming rosettes, to somewhat fruticose (branch-like and bushy), with lobes usually dorsiventral with raised tips, sometimes even cylindrical or slightly tapering. The upper thallus surface is bright to dark yellow (resulting from usnic acid), sometimes greenish, often wrinkled or somewhat folded. The lower thallus surface is weakly yellow, with black central parts, and lacks pseudocyphellae (tiny pores on the outer surface). The rhizinae (black hair-like strands that attach the lichen to their substrate) are laminal (originating from all across the thallus surface), almost never close to the margin and rather sparse, and either simple or irregularly branched.

The apothecia (the fruit body of the lichen) are somewhat marginal (positioned on the edge or near the margin) or laminal, and comprise a brown disc with an often finely scalloped edge. The asci (spore-bearing cells) are broadly club-shaped, with a wide ocular chamber (a wide, finger-like protrusion of the epiplasm into the apical region of the ascus), and large axial body. The thallus often has a strong staining reaction in Lugol's solution. Spores are spherical or nearly so, and number eight per ascus. Pycnidia are typically abundant, with either a marginal or laminal arrangement. They are generally conspicuous, black, situated on projections, and raised or immersed. The medulla is yellow to orange (from pinastric and vulpinic acids). The pycnidial wall contains some black pigment. The conidia are somewhat flask-shaped or lemon-shaped. The genus is characterized by the presence of the secondary metabolites pulvinic acid and vulpinic acid, which are derived from the shikimic acid biosynthetic pathway. These compounds, combined with usnic acid, give the species their characteristic yellow and green colors.

== Species ==
There are four species in Vulpicida, after a taxon merge in 2014. They are all found in arctic or boreal regions of the Northern Hemisphere.

- V. canadensis (Räsänen) J.-E.Mattsson & M.J.Lai

Originally Cetraria junier var. canadensis, published by Räsänen in 1933.

- V. juniperinus complex (L.) J.-E.Mattsson & M.J.Lai

Originally Lichen juniperinus, published by Linnaeus in 1753.
Composed of previously distinct groups of V. juniperinus, V. tilesii, and V. tubulosis.

- V. pinastri (Scop.) J.-E.Mattsson

Originally Lichen pinastra, published by Scopoli in 1772.

- V. viridis (Schwein.) J.-E.Mattsson & M.J.Lai

Originally Cetraria viridis, published by Halsey, and attributed to Schweinitz in 1824.

Species
V. canadensis	V. pinastri	V. viridis	V. juniperinus complex
