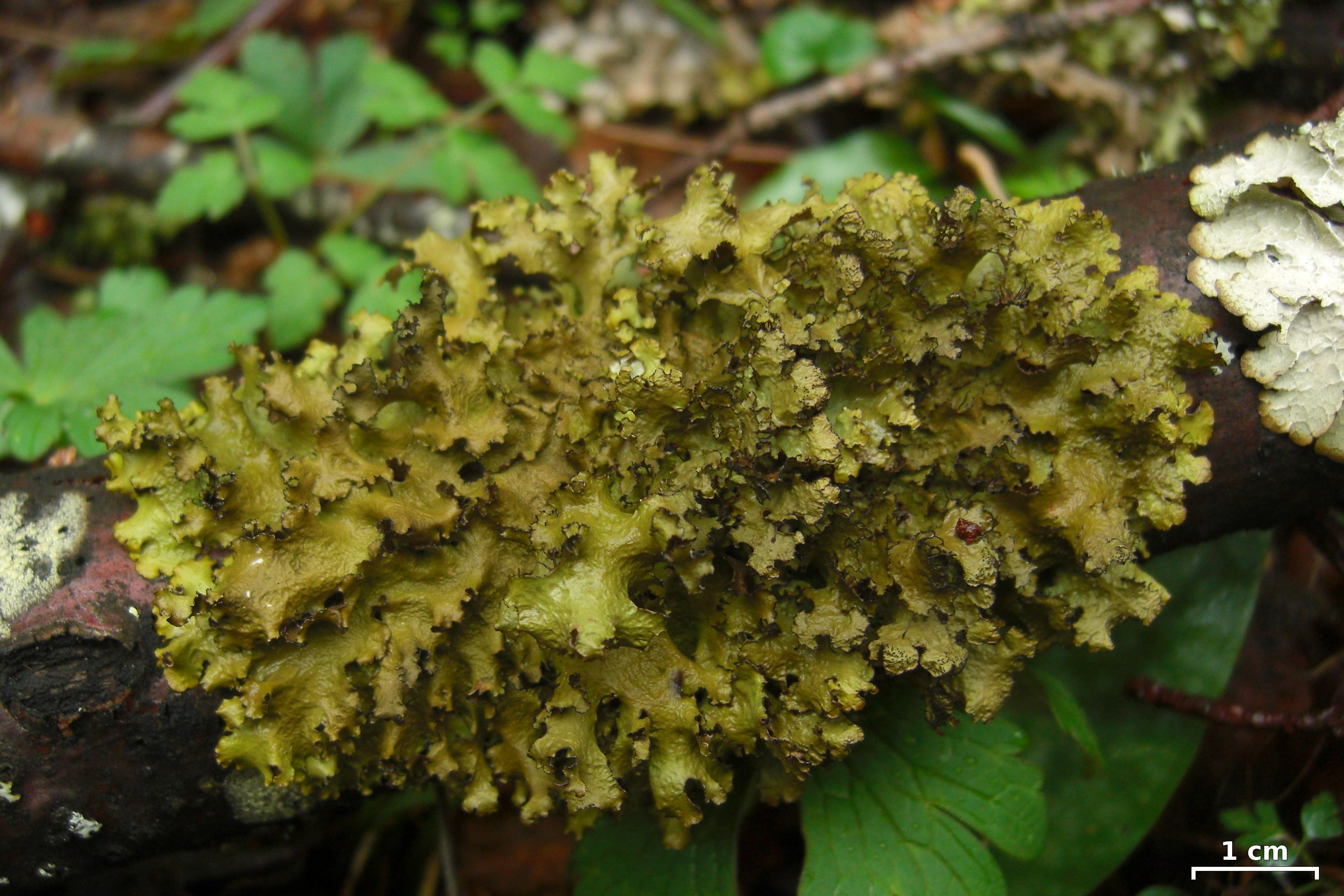
- Tuckermannopsis ciliaris

Scientific classification
- Kingdom: Fungi
- Division: Ascomycota
- Class: Lecanoromycetes
- Order: Lecanorales
- Family: Parmeliaceae
- Genus: Tuckermannopsis; Gyeln. (1933)

Type species
- Tuckermannopsis ciliaris (Ach.) Gyeln. (1933)

= Tuckermannopsis =

Genus of lichens

Tuckermannopsis is a genus of lichen-forming fungi in the family Parmeliaceae. The genus contains about twelve species of foliose (leafy) to somewhat fruticose (bushy) lichens with brownish or greenish thalli. Species in Tuckermannopsis are found primarily in temperate and boreal regions of the Northern Hemisphere, with centres of diversity in western North America and East Asia. Members of the genus are distinguished by their cetrarioid growth form, with reproductive structures largely restricted to the margins of the lobes, and the absence of usnic acid in their upper cortex.

== Taxonomy ==
The genus was circumscribed in 1933 by the Hungarian lichenologist Vilmos Kőfaragó-Gyelnik. Some sources have suggested that the genus name Tuckermannopsis honours the American lichenologist Edward Tuckerman (1817–1886), and it is sometimes spelled Tuckermanopsis based on this assumption. However, Gyelnik's original spelling was 'Tuckermannopsis' and his paper contains no explicit dedication, so the eponymy remains unconfirmed.

Tuckermannopsis ciliaris was assigned as the type, and at that time, only species. The type species is a cetrarioid lichen, meaning it is erect, foliose, and with apothecia and pycnidia (sexual and asexual reproductive structures, respectively) that are largely restricted to the margins of the lobes. Starting in the 1980s, the genus became a wastebasket taxon containing cetrarioid species of uncertain taxonomic affinities. In 2001, Ingvar Kärnefelt and Arne Thell attempted to delimit Tuckermannopsis based on a combination of morphology and molecular phylogeny, although the DNA of only four species was used in the analysis. They accepted seven species in the genus, with distribution centres in western North America and Japan.

In 2017, Divakar and colleagues used a recently developed "temporal phylogenetic" approach to identify temporal bands for specific taxonomic ranks in the family Parmeliaceae, suggesting that groups of species that diverged within the time window of 29.45–32.55 million years ago represent genera. They proposed to synonymize Tuckermannopsis (and several other cetrelioid genera) with Nephromopsis, so that all the genera within the Parmeliaceae are about the same age. Although some of their proposed taxonomic changes were accepted, the synonymization of the cetrelioid genera with Nephromopsis was not accepted in a later critical analysis of the temporal phylogenetic technique for use in fungal systematics.

== Description ==
Characteristic of genus Tuckermannopsis include a thallus that is either foliose (leafy) or somewhat fruticose (shrubby) with an upper surface that is brown or greenish in colour; cylindrical asci with a small tholus (a thickened apical region) and broad axial body; ascospores that are more or less spherical, measuring 4–8 μm in diameter; the absence of the secondary metabolite usnic acid in the cortex, and the presence of various compounds in the medulla.

== Species ==
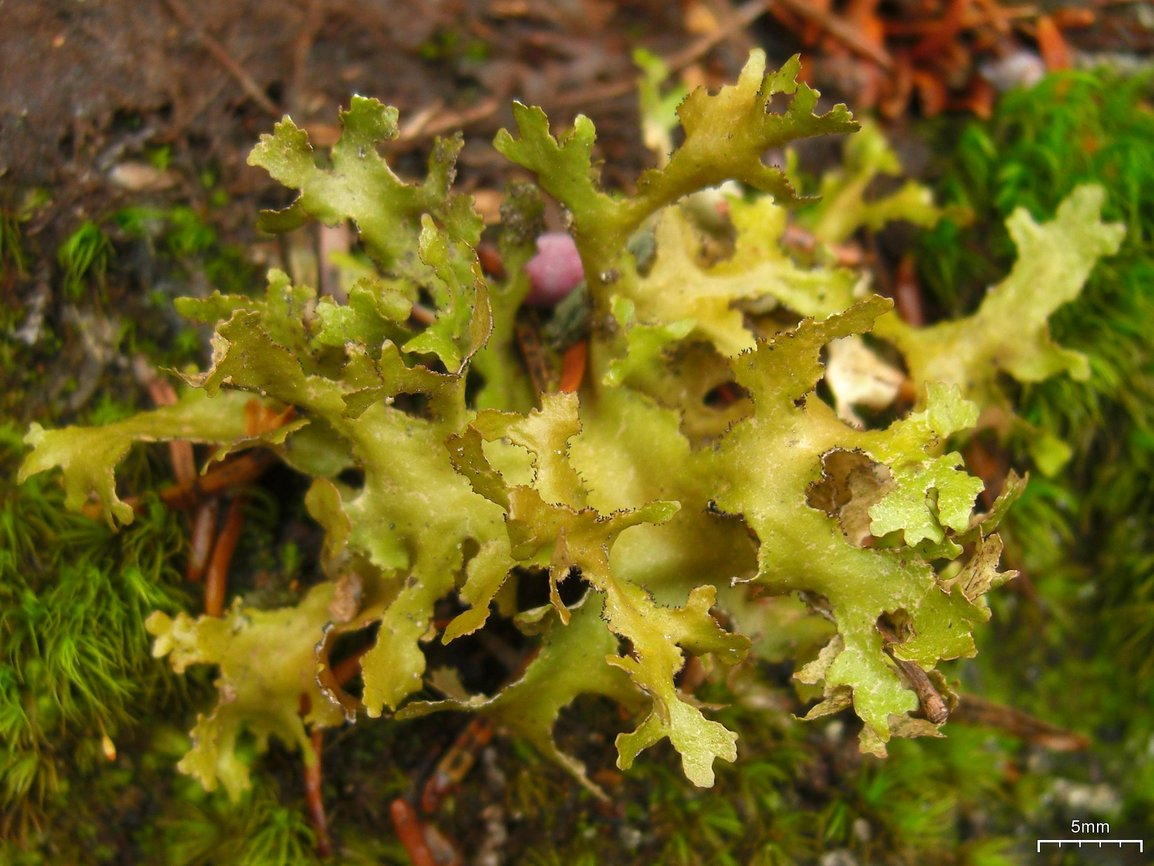
Tuckermannopsis subalpina

- Tuckermannopsis americana (Spreng.) Hale (1987)
- Tuckermannopsis aurescens (Tuck.) Hale (1987)
- Tuckermannopsis chlorophylla (Willd.) Hale (1987)
- Tuckermannopsis ciliaris (Ach.) Gyeln. (1933)
- Tuckermannopsis gilva (Asahina) M.J.Lai (1980)
- Tuckermannopsis hengduanensis (X.Q.Gao & L.H.Chen) M.J.Lai & Z.G.Qian (2007)
- Tuckermannopsis microphyllica (W.L.Culb. & C.F.Culb.) M.J.Lai (1980)
- Tuckermannopsis orbata (Nyl.) M.J.Lai (1980)
- Tuckermannopsis subalpina (Imshaug) Kärnefelt (1993)
- Tuckermannopsis ulophylloides (Asahina) M.J.Lai (1980)
- Tuckermannopsis weii (X.Q.Gao & L.H.Chen) Randlane & Saag (2003)

The lichen once called Tuckermannopsis inermis (Nyl.) Kärnefelt (1993) has been transferred to genus Melanohalea, as Masonhalea inermis. T. coralligera (W.A.Weber) W.A.Weber (1991) and T. fendleri (Nyl.) Hale (1987) have been moved to genus Tuckermanella, created in 2003 to contain cetrarioid lichens previously placed in the "Cetraria fendleri" species group.
