= Protolichesterinic acid =

Chemical compound

Names
- IUPAC name (2S,3R)-4-methylidene-5-oxo-2-tridecyloxolane-3-carboxylic acid
- Other names Protolichesterinic acid

Identifiers
CAS Number	493-46-9
3D model (JSmol)	Interactive image
ChEMBL	ChEMBL2227775
ChemSpider	192056
PubChem CID	221373
CompTox Dashboard (EPA)	DTXSID40932417
- InChI: InChI=1S/C19H32O4/c1-3-4-5-6-7-8-9-10-11-12-13-14-16-17(18(20)21)15(2)19(22)23-16/h16-17H,2-14H2,1H3,(H,20,21)/t16-,17+/m0/s1 Key: WZYZDHVPSZCEEP-DLBZAZTESA-N
- SMILES: O=C1OC(CCCCCCCCCCCCC)C(C(=O)O)C1=C

Properties
Chemical formula	C_{19}H_{32}O_{4}
Molar mass	324.461 g·mol^{−1}
Melting point	107.5 °C (225.5 °F; 380.6 K)
- Except where otherwise noted, data are given for materials in their standard state (at 25 °C [77 °F], 100 kPa). Infobox references

Protolichesterinic acid is a naturally occurring γ-lactone compound found in various lichen species. Its structure consists of a combination of a lactone ring with a carboxylic acid group and a long aliphatic side chain. First isolated in the early 20th century, protolichesterinic acid has drawn scientific interest due to its diverse biological activities, including antimicrobial, antifungal, and anti-inflammatory properties. It is also noted for its potential as a therapeutic agent, particularly as a selective inhibitor of the 5-lipoxygenase enzyme, which is implicated in inflammatory diseases. Protolichesterinic acid is typically extracted from lichens such as Cetraria islandica using advanced chromatographic techniques and has been studied for its role in both natural product chemistry and pharmacology.

== History ==
The study of lichen acids related to protolichesterinic acid began in 1845, when Schnedermann and Wilhelm Knop isolated lichesterinic acid from Cetraria islandica var. vulgaris. They determined it had a melting point around 120 °C (248 °F) and established its composition as C_{19}H_{32}O_{4}. Further research by H. Sinnhold in 1898 worked with pure lichesterinic acid (melting point 124.5–125 °C). In 1900, Oswald Hesse isolated three varieties (α-, β-, and γ-) of lichesterinic acid from Cetraria islandica, with specific rotations of +27.9°, +27.9°, and +16° respectively.

Protolichesterinic acid was first isolated at the beginning of the 20th century by Friedrich Wilhelm Zopf from the lichen Cetraria cucullata (now known as Cladocetraria cucullata). Zopf initially found it alongside usnic acid and noticed that while it showed similarities to lichesterinic acid in some properties, it differed significantly in melting point and other characteristics. The compound was named "protolichesterinic acid" to reflect its close relationship to lichesterinic acid, and the discovery was published in Liebigs Annalen in 1902. After obtaining it in crystalline form through extraction with ether and recrystallization from warm benzol, Zopf determined that protolichesterinic acid formed thin, rhombic, pearly plates that melted at 103–104 °C (217–219 °F), lower than lichesterinic acid's melting point of 124–125 °C (255–257 °F). He also established that the acid was readily soluble in cold ether and absolute alcohol, and unlike lichesterinic acid, could reduce potassium permanganate solution in the cold. Further work by Böhme in 1903 showed that the compound had a specific rotation of +29.3° and could decompose under reduced pressure (40mm) to form C_{18}H_{32}O_{3}. Later work by Asano and Asahina established that natural protolichesterinic acid actually has a negative specific rotation ([α]_{D} = −12.71°), indicating it is the (−)-(2S,3R) enantiomer, while the material studied by Zopf and Böhme was the (+)-(2R,3S) form.

== Isolation and analytical methods ==
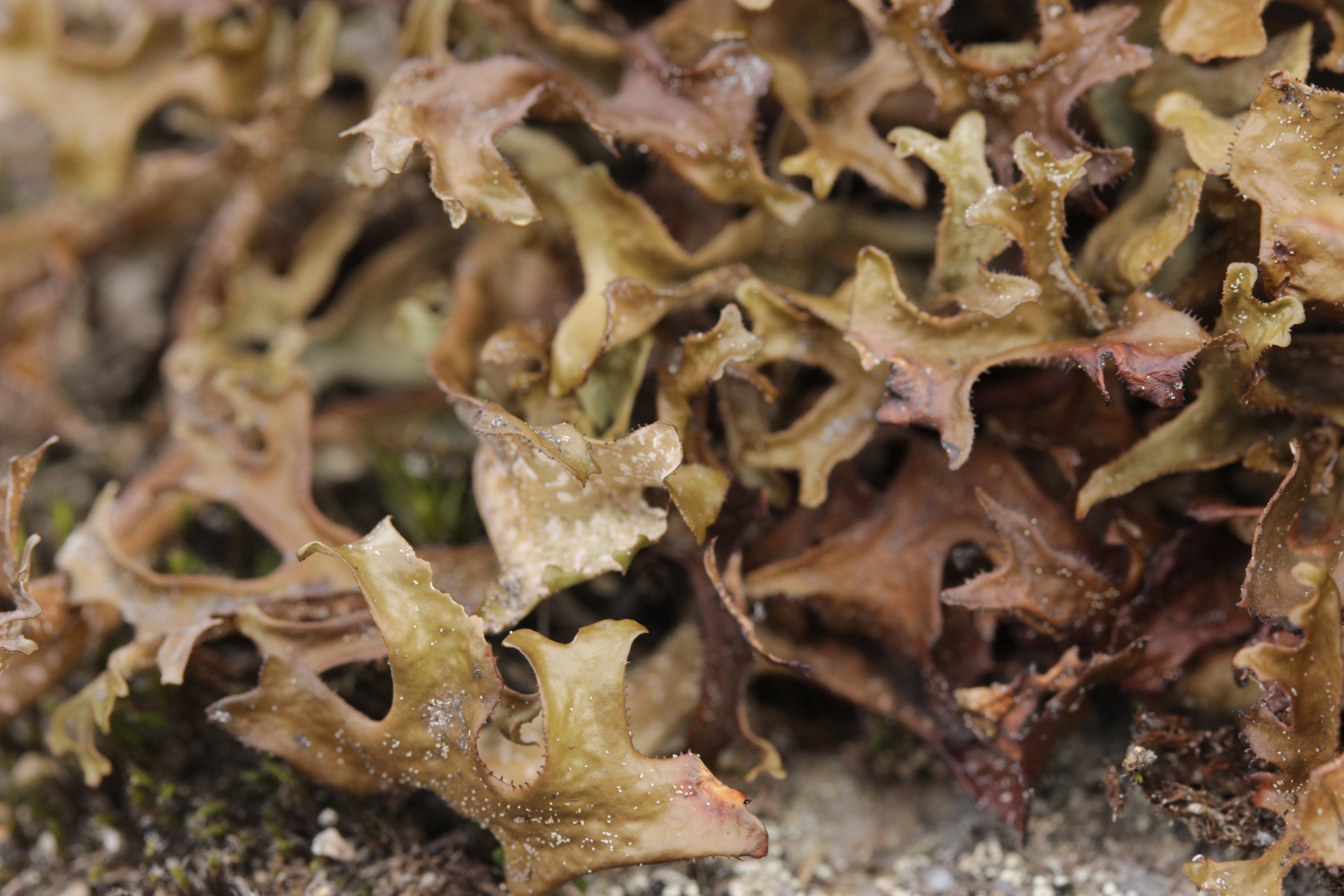
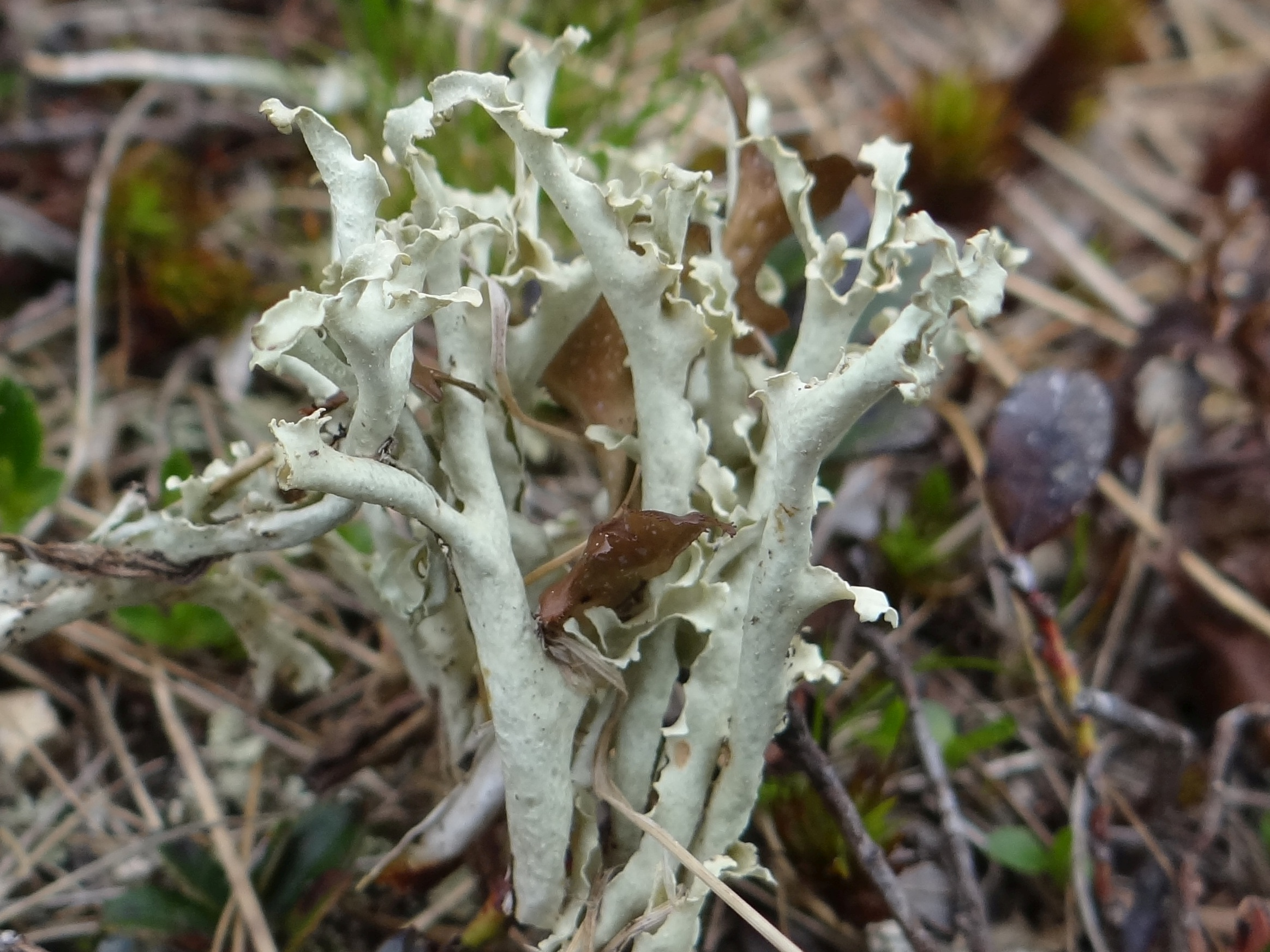
Cetraria islandica (left) and Flavocetraria cucullata are two lichens from which protolichesterinic acid was first isolated and characterised.

Protolichesterinic acid is primarily isolated from Cetraria islandica through modern chromatographic techniques. A standard method employs a two-step process, beginning with petroleum ether extraction in a Soxhlet extractor followed by crystallization. Initial purification uses size-exclusion chromatography with Sephadex LH20 (a size-exclusion resin) in a dichloromethane-acetone system to separate protolichesterinic acid from other paraconic acids. Final purification employs centrifugal partition chromatography using a solvent system of n-heptane, ethyl acetate, and acetonitrile, achieving over 99% purity with yields exceeding 65%. While the compound exhibits instability in acetonitrile, converting to lichesterinic acid, it remains stable when stored in ethanol.

Quantitative analysis is typically performed using reversed-phase high-performance liquid chromatography (HPLC) with UV detection. A validated method using a LiChrosorb RP-8 column achieves separation within 3.7 minutes and demonstrates excellent linearity (0.125–2.5 μg/ml) with a detection limit of 1 nanogram. The method's reliability is confirmed by its high precision (0.78% relative standard deviation) and good recovery rate (90%), making it suitable for accurate determination of protolichesterinic acid content in biological samples.

== Properties ==
Protolichesterinic acid is a member of the class of chemicals known as lactone fatty acids, a group that includes lichesterinic acid, alloprotolichesterinic acid, nephromopsinic acid, and nephrosterinic acid. In its purified form, protolichesterinic acid is a crystalline solid that forms lustrous plates when recrystallized from benzene or acetic acid at temperatures below 50 °C (122 °F). It has a melting point of 107.5 °C (225.5 °F). The compound exists in both enantiomeric forms, with the (+)-enantiomer showing an optical rotation of [α]D +12° in chloroform and the (-)-enantiomer showing [α]D -12° in chloroform.

In ultraviolet–visible spectroscopy, it shows maximum absorption at 218 nm in methanol. Its infrared spectrum (KBr) shows characteristic peaks including those corresponding to carboxylic acid (3450 cm^{−1}), alkene (3050 cm^{−1}), and carbonyl (1720 cm^{−1}) functionalities.

Nuclear magnetic resonance spectroscopy confirms its structure, with distinctive signals in the ^{1}H NMR spectrum including the terminal methyl group at δ 0.68 ppm and alkene protons at δ 6.03 and 6.39 ppm. The ^{13}C NMR spectrum shows key resonances for the carboxylic acid (174.4 ppm), alkene (132.6 and 125.9 ppm), and lactone carbonyl (168.2 ppm) carbons.

== Biological activity ==
Protolichesterinic acid exhibits diverse biological activities, including antimicrobial, enzyme inhibitory, and anticancer properties. Studies with the compound isolated from Usnea albopunctata have demonstrated broad-spectrum antimicrobial activity. It shows strong antibacterial effects against Klebsiella pneumoniae (minimum inhibitory concentration 0.25 μg/mL) and Vibrio cholerae (0.5 μg/mL), exceeding the potency of ciprofloxacin. The compound is also active against methicillin-resistant Staphylococcus aureus (MRSA) and shows notable antifungal activity against Trichophyton rubrum, surpassing amphotericin B in potency.

As an inhibitor, protolichesterinic acid selectively targets 5-lipoxygenase while showing minimal effect on cyclooxygenase. This selective inhibition suggests potential applications in treating inflammatory conditions, particularly those involving leukotriene bronchoconstrictors. Structure-activity studies indicate that while the stereospecific side chain and exocyclic double bond are not essential for activity, the carboxylic acid group plays a crucial role. The compound also inhibits the DNA polymerase activity of human immunodeficiency virus-1 reverse transcriptase (HIV-1 RT).

Research has revealed that protolichesterinic acid affects cancer cell metabolism by disrupting mitochondrial function through inhibition of oxidative phosphorylation and enhancement of glycolysis. The compound undergoes cellular processing via the mercapturic pathway, forming conjugates with glutathione. While this process depletes glutathione initially, it paradoxically stimulates increased glutathione synthesis. The compound's anti-proliferative effects appear particularly pronounced in cancer cells with compromised mitochondrial function, suggesting a relationship between mitochondrial fitness and therapeutic efficacy.

== Biosynthesis ==
Early biosynthesis studies in Cetraria islandica showed that protolichesterinic acid is produced in very small quantities (approximately 0.1%) in the whole lichen. The compound is formed through the condensation of a fatty acid derivative with a C3 or C4 fragment derived from pyruvate or related precursors in the glycolytic pathway. Sixteen of its carbon atoms come from head-to-tail linkage of acetate units. The compound is not produced by isolated mycobionts in submerged culture, suggesting that the symbiotic relationship between fungi and algae may be important for its biosynthesis. The production appears to be influenced by aeration conditions.

Further studies using radiolabeled precursors revealed seasonal variation in protolichesterinic acid biosynthesis in C. islandica. When [1-^{14}C]acetate and [1,4-^{14}C2]succinic acid were administered to the whole lichen in a glucose solution during summer months, both precursors were incorporated into protolichesterinic acid, supporting the hypothesis that aliphatic lichen acids have common precursors related to the citric acid and fatty acid cycles. However, during winter months, the lichen showed no incorporation of these precursors, indicating that biosynthesis becomes inactive during this season. The extremely low levels of incorporation (approximately 0.004%) suggested that protolichesterinic acid biosynthesis represents a very minor metabolic pathway in C. islandica. These findings helped explain earlier contradictory results regarding succinate incorporation, which varied based on the season when experiments were conducted.

== Chemical synthesis ==
A variety of synthetic approaches have progressively improved the efficiency and stereoselectivity of protolichesterinic acid synthesis while developing new methodologies for constructing similar lactone-containing natural products. The first total synthesis of dl-protolichesterinic acid was reported in 1958 by Eugene van Tamelen and Shirley Bach. Their synthesis involved a four-step route: conversion of methyl 2-hexadecenoate to methyl 3-tridecylglycidate, ring-opening with dimethyl malonate anion, formation of the lactonic diacid salt, and α-methylenation using formaldehyde and diethylamine. The synthetic material matched natural protolichesterinic acid by infrared spectroscopy and chemical transformations.

In 1993, Murta, de Azevedo and Greene achieved the first synthesis of (-)-protolichesterinic acid, establishing its absolute stereochemistry as (2S,3R). Their approach employed a facially selective 2+2 cycloaddition of dichloroketene with an enantiopure O-alkyl enol ether as the key step, completing the synthesis in 11 steps with 17% overall yield.

Mandal, Maiti and Roy reported a stereoselective synthesis in 1998 using radical cyclization of epoxides. Their method employed bis(cyclopentadienyl)titanium(III) chloride to effect radical cyclization, forming key tetrahydrofuran intermediates. The four-step sequence involved epoxide cyclization, protection, lactone formation, and Jones oxidation, achieving an 80% yield in the final step.

A synthesis of (+)-protolichesterinic acid was later developed through a 10-step process with 16.4% overall yield, using a diastereoselective orthoester Johnson–Claisen rearrangement as the key step. The synthesis concluded with α-methylenation using methoxy magnesium methylcarbonate and formaldehyde.

In 2014, Zeller, Riener and Nicewicz introduced a more environmentally friendly approach using a polar radical crossover cycloaddition reaction. Their method employed a photooxidant system with 450 nm LEDs to achieve diastereoselective synthesis under mild conditions.

In 2016, Fernandes and Nallasivam reported a protecting-group-free synthesis using palladium-catalysed Suzuki-Miyaura coupling to install a phenyl group as a masked carboxylic acid, followed by ruthenium-catalysed Sharpless epoxidation. The synthesis began with chiral reduction using (R)-alpine borane and concluded with α-methylenation, achieving 60% yield in the final step and 9.5% overall yield.
