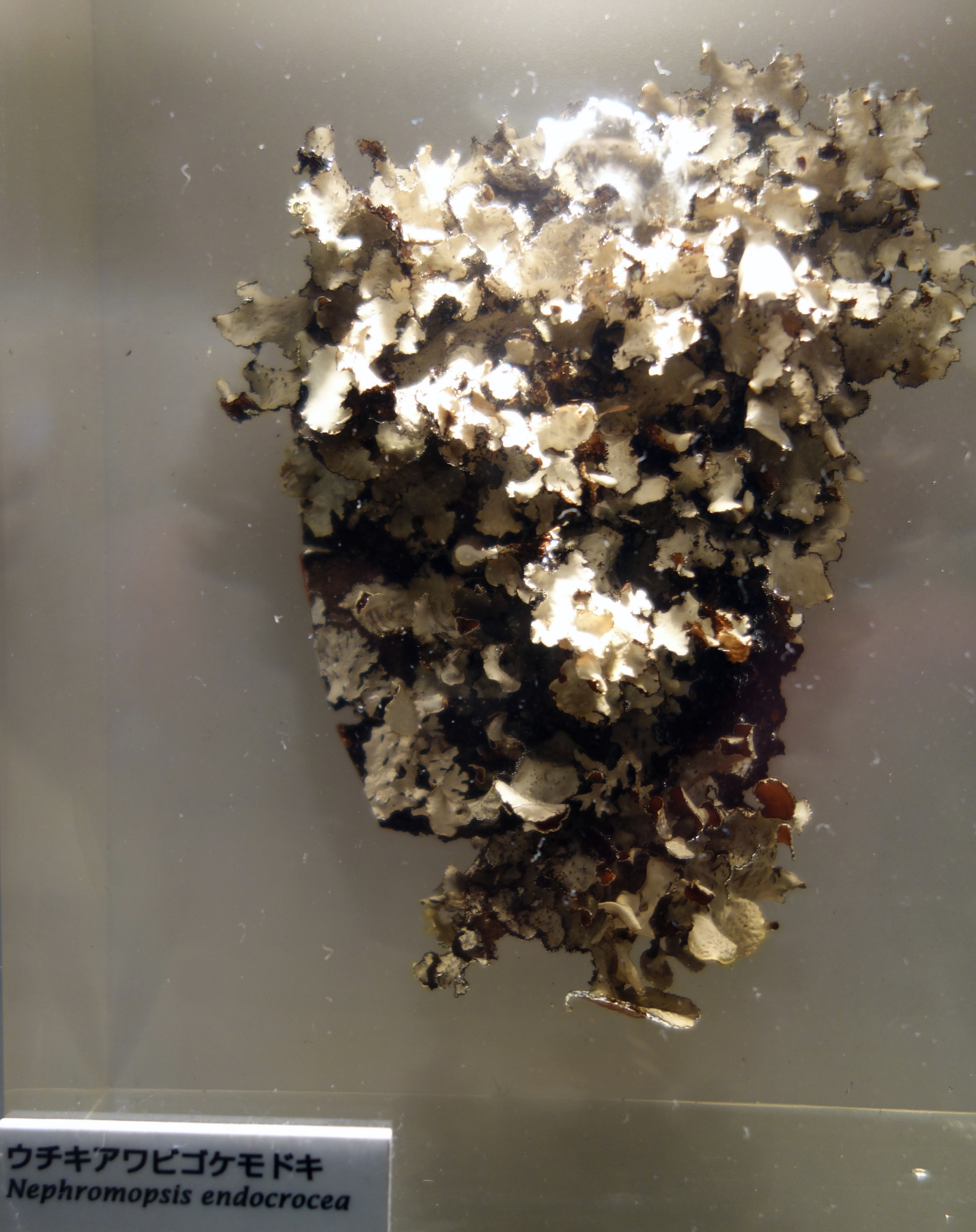
- Nephromopsis endocrocea

Scientific classification
- Domain: Eukaryota
- Kingdom: Fungi
- Division: Ascomycota
- Class: Lecanoromycetes
- Order: Lecanorales
- Family: Parmeliaceae
- Genus: Nephromopsis; Müll. Arg.

Type species
- Nephromopsis stracheyi (C. Bab.) Müll. Arg.

Synonyms
- Ahtiana Goward; Arctocetraria Kärnefelt & A. Thell; Cetraria sect. Nephromopsis (Müll. Arg.) Rass; Cetrariopsis Kurok; Cetreliopsis M.J. Lai; Flavocetraria Kärnefelt & A. Thell; Flavocetrariella D.D. Awasthi; Kaernefeltia A. Thell & Goward; Masonhalea Kärnefelt; Tuckermanella Essl; Tuckermanopsis Gyeln

= Nephromopsis =

Genus of fungi

Nephromopsis is a genus of lichenized fungi within the Parmeliaceae family.
