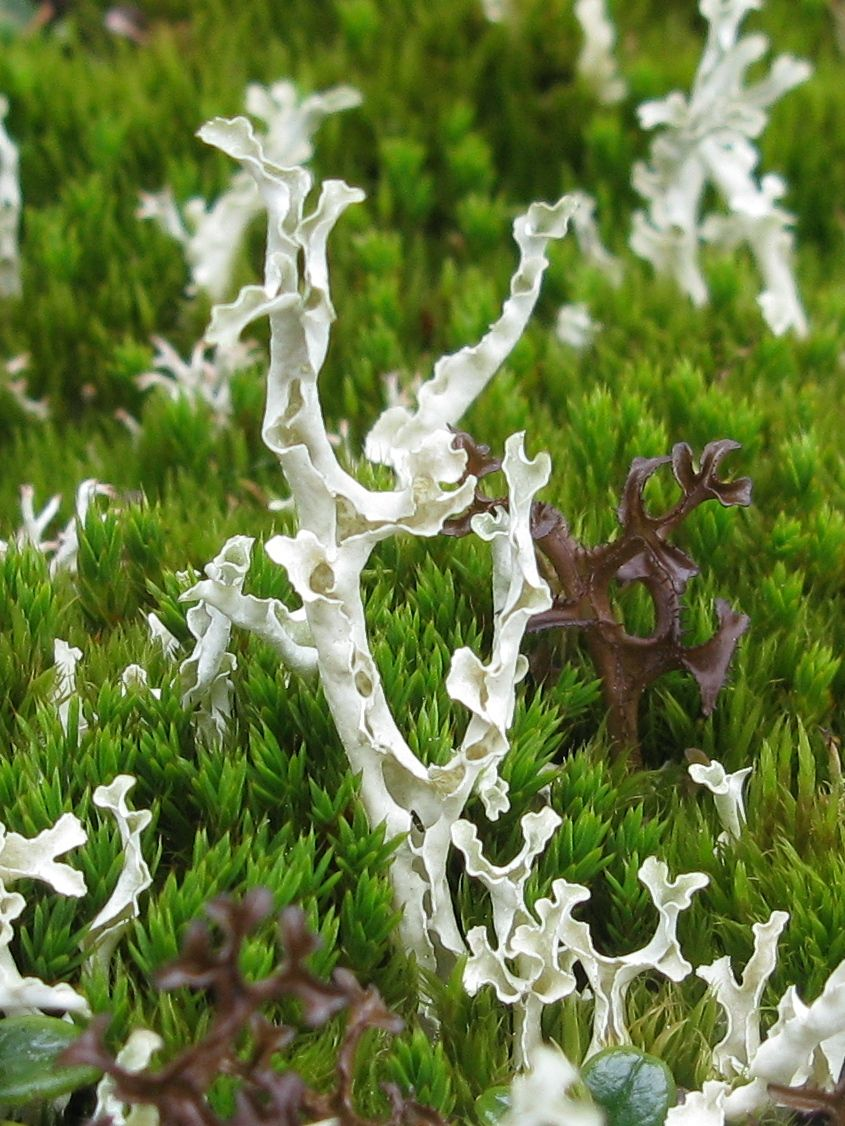

Scientific classification
- Domain: Eukaryota
- Kingdom: Fungi
- Division: Ascomycota
- Class: Lecanoromycetes
- Order: Lecanorales
- Family: Parmeliaceae
- Genus: Cladocetraria; Chesnokov, Prokopiev & Konoreva (2023)
- Species: C. minuscula

Binomial name
- Cladocetraria minuscula (Elenkin & Savicz) Chesnokov, Prokopiev, Konoreva & Davydov (2023)

Synonyms
- Cetraria cucullata f. minuscula Elenkin & Savicz (1910); Flavocetraria minuscula (Elenkin & Savicz) Ahti, Poryadina & Zhurb. (2005); Cetraria minuscula (Elenkin & Savicz) McCune (2018)

= Cladocetraria =

Species of lichen

Cladocetraria is a fungal genus in the family Parmeliaceae. It contains the single species Cladocetraria minuscula, a fruticose (shrubby) lichen. The genus was established in 2023 based on morphological and molecular studies that distinguished it from related genera. It is characterised by its small size, growing only 2–3 centimetres tall, with distinctive hollow, tube-like structures that branch in a fork-like pattern and have inward-curling tips covered in a white powdery coating. The lichen produces several chemical compounds (lichen products), including usnic acid, which gives it its yellowish-green colour.

The species has a restricted distribution in the Northern Hemisphere, being found primarily in northeastern Asia and northwestern North America, particularly in the Russian Far East. While it was historically confused with small forms of the similar species Flavocetraria cucullata, genetic studies have confirmed it represents a distinct evolutionary lineage within the "cetrarioid core" group of the family Parmeliaceae. The lichen grows mainly on the ground among mosses in both boreal forest and tundra environments, showing a preference for mesic (moderately moist) conditions and occasionally growing on rotten mossy logs embedded in soil.

== Taxonomy ==
The generic name Cladocetraria is derived from its morphological similarity to the broken podetia (upright structures) found in the genus Cladonia, combined with its historical classification within cetrarioid lichens.

Cladocetraria was established as a monotypic genus in 2023 by Sergey Chesnokov, Ilya Prokopiev, and Liudmila Konoreva. Its single species was first described in 1910 by Alexander Elenkin and Vsevolod Savich as Cetraria cucullata f. minuscula, based on specimens collected by I.M. Shchegolev on 21 May 1903. The material was collected from a dry peat bog at an elevation between 400 and 1000 metres in the Chelasin River area of the Dzhugdzhur Range, Khabarovsk Territory, Russia. The holotype specimen is preserved in the Komarov Botanical Institute, with an isotype also housed in the same institution.

For nearly a century, it remained classified as a form or variety of Cetraria cucullata until 2005, when Teuvo Ahti, Lena Poryadina, and Mikhail Zhurbenko elevated it to species status within the genus Flavocetraria. This taxonomic change was supported by detailed morphological studies that distinguished it from similar taxa, particularly small morphs of F. cucullata from various Arctic regions that had been incorrectly identified as this taxon. In 2018, Bruce McCune transferred it to Cetraria as C. minuscula, following a broader revision of cetrarioid lichens.

The taxonomic history reflects an evolving understanding of this distinctive lichen, from its initial recognition as a minor morphological variant to its eventual confirmation as a separate species with consistent distinguishing characteristics. Early confusion with diminutive forms of F. cucullata from high Arctic locations like Franz Josef Land and Severnaya Zemlya was resolved through careful morphological analysis, helping to clarify its true distribution pattern.

=== Phylogeny ===
Molecular phylogenetics studies published in 2009 confirmed that Cladocetraria belongs to a strongly supported monophyletic clade within Parmeliaceae known as the "cetrarioid core", which consists of about 90 species across 14 genera. This clade is characterised by conidial morphology, which shows clear correlation with DNA-based phylogeny compared to other morphological characteristics in the family.

Molecular studies based on ITS/5.8S and mtSSU sequence data show that Cladocetraria represents a lineage within the cetrarioid core of the family Parmeliaceae. Among genetic markers studied, the ITS region was most variable, while RPB1 also provided phylogenetic data with minimal alignment ambiguity. In contrast, the mitochondrial small subunit (mtSSU) provided little phylogenetic signal at this taxonomic level. This placement clarified earlier taxonomic questions that had arisen from relying solely on morphological characteristics. Initial studies based on a single specimen had produced conflicting results, but broader sampling showed the genus's evolutionary position.

Genetic distance analyses show that Cladocetraria shows low sequence divergence compared to many other genera in Parmeliaceae, with maximum ITS genetic distances comparable to those found in genera like Cetrelia and Relicina. This suggests the genus may be more narrowly circumscribed than some other members of the family. While morphologically similar to Flavocetraria cucullata, genetic evidence shows that Cladocetraria belongs to the 'Cetraria' clade rather than the 'Nephromopsis' clade where Flavocetraria is placed.

The genus forms a well-supported monophyletic group that is most closely related to Cetraria obtusata, though phylogenetic analyses indicate these taxa are only distantly related. Cladocetraria shows phylogenetic similarities to the genus Cetrariella. However, its morphological, anatomical and chemical features support its status as a separate genus.

== Description ==
=== Morphology ===
Cladocetraria is characterised by its distinctive upright (erect) growth form, with leaf-like structures that form hollow tubes. The main body of the lichen, the thallus, grows 2–3 cm tall (occasionally reaching 4 cm) and measures 0.5–3 mm in width. The tubes are typically branched once or twice in a fork-like pattern.

One of the most distinctive features of the genus is the peculiar shape of its branch tips, which curl inward like small helmets and show faint patches of white powdery coating (pruina). The upper surface, which faces the inside of the tube, appears yellowish-green to green and has a smooth, glossy texture. The lower surface, forming the outside of the tube, ranges from pale yellowish-green to pale green and is also smooth. At the base of the plant, the tissue often takes on a reddish colouration.

The margins of the tubes may occasionally grow together (become fused), and along these edges, the lichen develops special pore-like structures called pseudocyphellae. These appear as a dotted line pattern along the margins and help the lichen exchange gases with its environment. This arrangement of pseudocyphellae is an important characteristic that helps distinguish Cladocetraria from related genera.

=== Internal structure ===
Under a microscope, Cladocetraria has a layered structure. The upper and lower protective surfaces each measure about 50 μm thick and consist of tightly packed fungal cells with moderately thick walls. Beneath this lies the middle layer (medulla), which is white and compact, approaching the density of the cortical layers, and is made up of loosely woven fungal threads (hyphae) with thick cell walls.

Green algal cells (photobiont cells) are scattered throughout the upper portion of the medulla, where they provide energy through photosynthesis. These cells show a characteristic arrangement, occurring in distinct clusters of 5–20 cells.

=== Reproductive structures ===
While no spore-producing structures (apothecia) have been found in this genus, Cladocetraria does produce small, black, flask-like structures (pycnidia) along the margins of the thallus. These structures release tiny, rod-shaped reproductive cells, conidia, which measure 7.5–9 by 1–1.5 micrometres and are uniformly thickened throughout their length. The shape and size of these conidia are important diagnostic features that help separate this genus from its relatives.

=== Chemical characteristics ===
The lichen produces several distinctive chemical compounds that can be detected through laboratory analysis. The most prominent of these is usnic acid, which gives the lichen its yellowish colour. Additionally, the species contains lichesterinic acid and exists in two chemical forms (chemotypes): chemotype I, found in 18 specimens, produces allo-protolichesterinic acid (2.5 ± 0.2% of dry mass), while chemotype II, found in only 3 specimens, produces protolichesterinic acid (2.0 ± 0.2% of dry mass). These compounds never occur together in the same individual. Some specimens also contain dark pigments (naphthoquinones) in their lower portions. The usnic acid content ranges from 1.4 to 1.8% of dry mass across both chemotypes, while lichesterinic acid remains consistent at about 0.3% of dry mass.

== Similar species ==
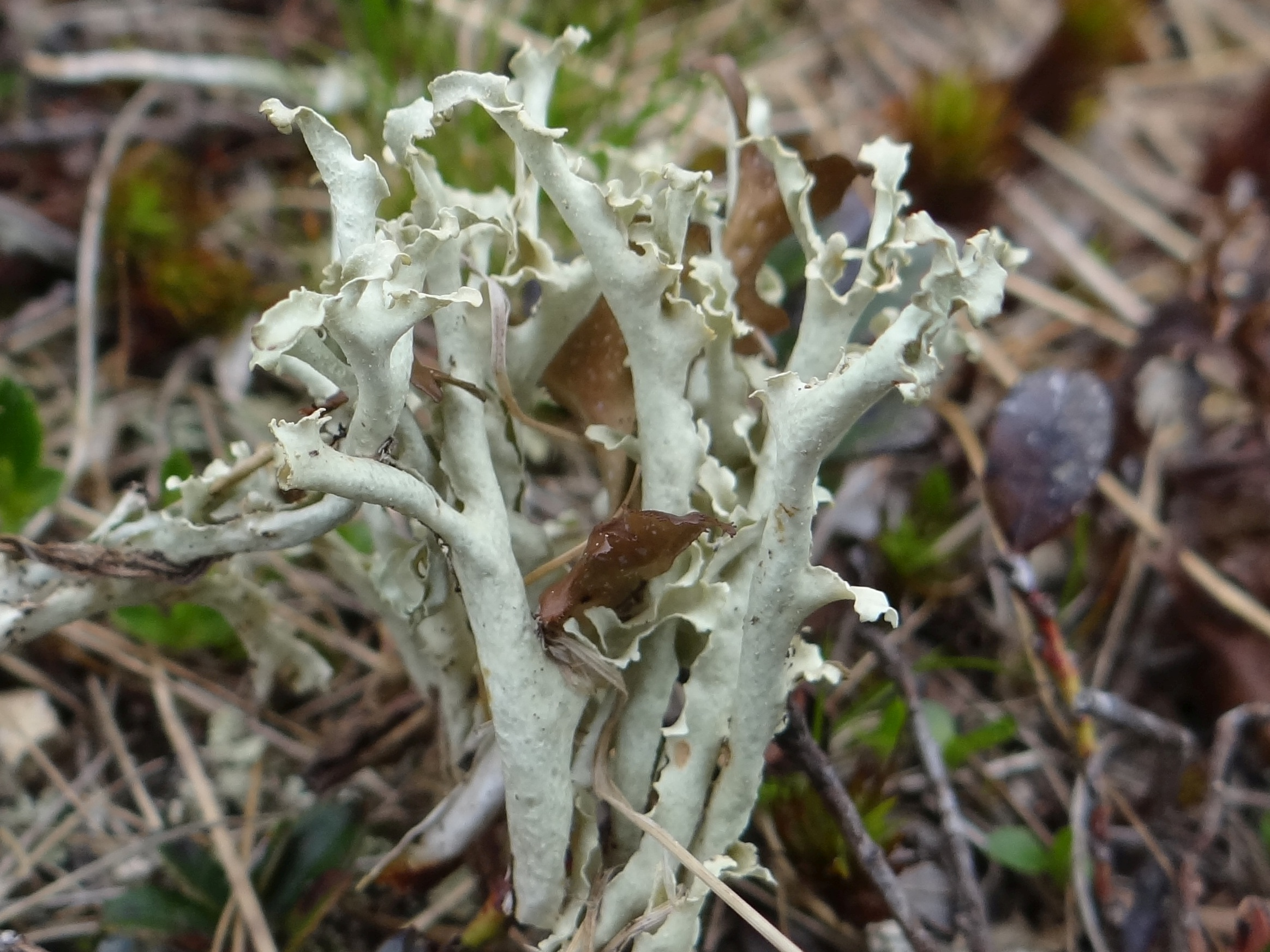
Flavocetraria cucullata is a lookalike species.

Cladocetraria minuscula commonly resembles Flavocetraria cucullata in both appearance and chemical composition. The species were historically considered forms of the same taxon until morphological and molecular studies showed they were separate species. C. minuscula has smaller, slender, erect, tube-like lobes that measure 1–2 mm in width and 2–3 cm in height. The main difference is the orientation of the lobe tips. In Cladocetraria minuscula, the tips are helmet-shaped and curl inward (up-turned), with a white powdery coating (pruina). In contrast, Flavocetraria cucullata has tips that turn outward and often curve downward, lacking any pruinose coating. This difference is consistent even in miniature forms of both species.

The pattern of pseudocyphellae (pore-like structures) also differs between the two species. Cladocetraria minuscula has pseudocyphellae in a dotted line pattern along the margins of the lobes. In Flavocetraria cucullata, these structures appear as scattered dots across the lower surface of the thallus.

Microscopic examination reveals additional differences in reproductive structures. Cladocetraria minuscula produces longer (7.5–9 μm) rod-shaped conidia that are uniformly thickened throughout their length. By comparison, Flavocetraria cucullata has shorter (5–6 μm) dumbbell-shaped conidia. These conidial characteristics help distinguish between the species under microscopic examination.

Chemical analysis shows differences as well. While both species show negative reactions to standard chemical spot tests (K, C, and P), they maintain distinct chemical profiles. The presence of usnic acid and protolichesterinic acid has been confirmed in C. minuscula through thin-layer chromatography. While both species share some chemical compounds, they differ in their secondary metabolite profiles. Cladocetraria minuscula lacks the gyrophoric acid that is present in some chemotypes of Flavocetraria cucullata, providing another way to distinguish between these species.

== Distribution and habitat ==
=== Geographic range ===
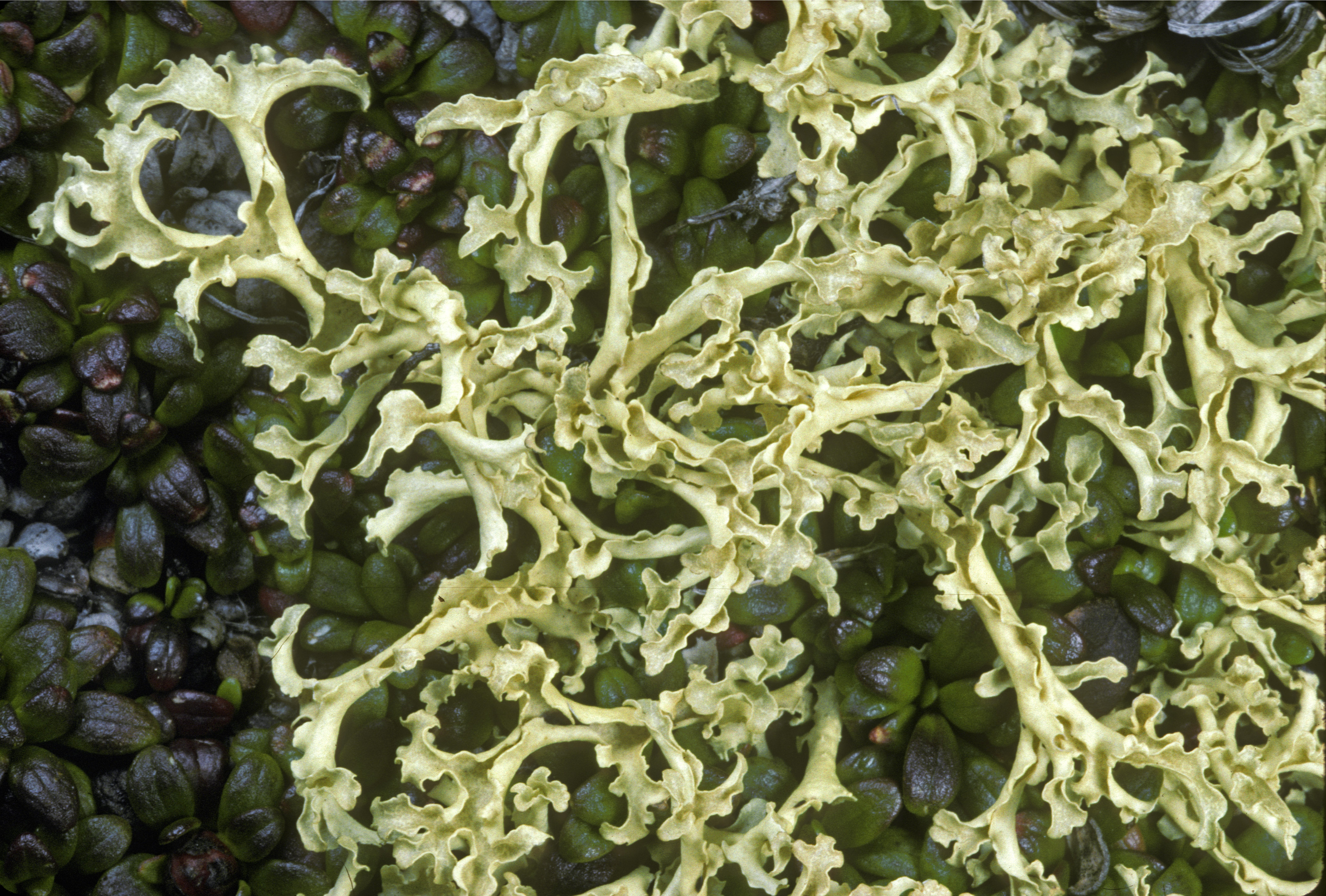
Cladocetraria minuscula in Alaska

Cladocetraria minuscula has a Northern Hemisphere distribution, primarily occurring in northeastern Asia and northwestern North America, particularly the Russian Far East. The species is notably absent from Northern Europe, suggesting a circumpolar distribution similar to other members of the cetrarioid core group.

In Asia, the species occurs mainly in the Russian Far East, with documented populations across several regions of Siberia. The species occurs throughout the Republic of Sakha (Yakutia), Transbaikal Territory, Khabarovsk Territory, and the Magadan Region. Additional populations have been documented in the Kamchatka Territory and Chukotka Autonomous Area. On the Taimyr Peninsula, the species has been found in Dryas-Carex-moss tundra, while in the Irkutsk Region at the Stanovoe Upland, it occurs in mountain stony lichen tundra at elevations around 1200 m.

In North America, the species is common in Interior Alaska, where it grows in patches alongside F. cucullata. First reported from Denali National Park and the Chena River area, it occurs at several additional locations including the Delta Junction region, along the Alaska Highway southeast of Tok, and in the Southeast Fairbanks Borough. Canadian populations have been documented in Nahanni National Park, Northwest Territories, at elevations between 450–500 m. Reports from high Arctic regions like Franz Josef Land and Severnaya Zemlya, these records were later identified as small forms of F. cucullata, show the species does not occur in the High Arctic.

=== Ecology and habitat preferences ===
Cladocetraria minuscula demonstrates specific habitat preferences within its range, occurring primarily in two major ecosystem types. In forest habitats, the species shows a strong preference for open conifer woodland, where it typically grows among mosses and other terricolous lichens. It can also be found on rotten mossy logs embedded in soil, always favouring areas with moderate moisture (mesic conditions) and often occurring within established lichen-moss communities.

While less common than in forested areas, the species also occurs in various tundra environments. These include Dryas-Carex-moss tundra communities on the Taimyr Peninsula and mountain stony lichen tundra at elevations around 1200 m in the Stanovoe Upland. The species can also be found in areas transitioning between forest and tundra zones.

Cladocetraria minuscula typically grows alongside other terricolous lichens and mosses, commonly associating with members of the genera Cladonia, Cetraria, Flavocetraria, and Foveolaria. This ecological flexibility, demonstrated by its presence in both forest and tundra environments, suggests adaptation to cold-climate conditions, though the species appears to prefer forested areas over strictly Arctic–alpine habitats. Its consistent association with mesic conditions and preference for growing among mosses indicates specific microhabitat requirements that may influence its restricted distribution pattern.
