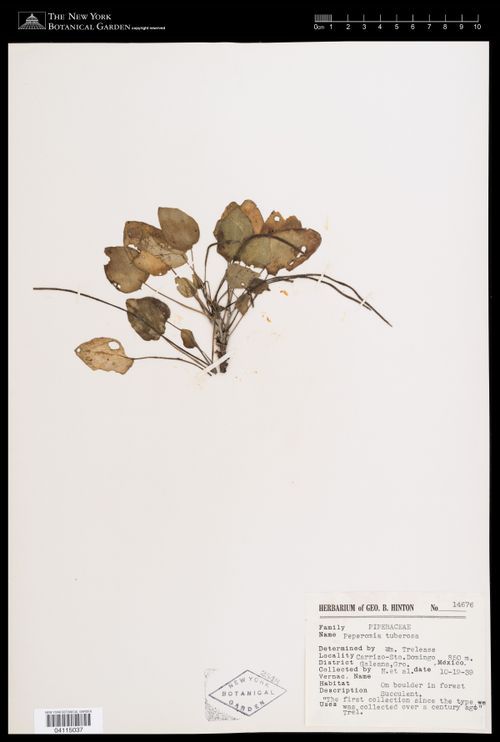

Scientific classification
- Kingdom: Plantae
- Clade: Embryophytes
- Clade: Tracheophytes
- Clade: Angiosperms
- Clade: Magnoliids
- Order: Piperales
- Family: Piperaceae
- Genus: Peperomia
- Species: P. tuberosa

Binomial name
- Peperomia tuberosa Opiz

Synonyms
- Piper tuberosum (Opiz) D.Dietr.

= Peperomia tuberosa =

Species of flowering plant

Peperomia tuberosa is a species of flowering plant from the genus Peperomia. It was first described by Philipp Maximilian Opiz and published in the book "Reliquiae Haenkeanae 1(3): 164. 1828 ". It primarily grows on wet tropical biomes. It may a synonym of Peperomia lanceolatopeltata. It grows primarily in the seasonally dry tropical biome.

== Distribution ==
It is endemic to Mexico.

- Mexico
  - Malinalco
  - Michoacan
    - Uruapan
  - Guerrero
