= Veselskya =

Scientific classification
- Kingdom: Plantae
- Clade: Tracheophytes
- Clade: Angiosperms
- Clade: Eudicots
- Clade: Rosids
- Order: Brassicales
- Family: Brassicaceae
- Genus: Veselskya; Opiz
- Species: V. griffithiana

Binomial name
- Veselskya griffithiana (Boiss.) Opiz

Synonyms
- Pyramidium Boiss.; Pyramidium griffithianum Boiss.

Genus of flowering plants

Veselskya is a monotypic genus of flowering plants belonging to the family Brassicaceae. It only contains one known species, Veselskya griffithiana (Boiss.) Opiz. It is native to Afghanistan.

The genus name of Veselskya is in honour of Friedrich Veselský (1813–1866), a Bohemian lawyer in present-day Prešov, he was also an amateur botanist with a focus on mushrooms. The Latin specific epithet of griffithiana refers to William Griffith (1810–1845), who was a British naturalist, doctor and botanist. Both the species and the genus were first described and published in Lotos Vol. 4 on page 257 in 1856. The name replaced the earlier Pyramidium Boiss., an illegitimate name, as Pyramidium S. E. Bridel, a genus of mosses predates it.
