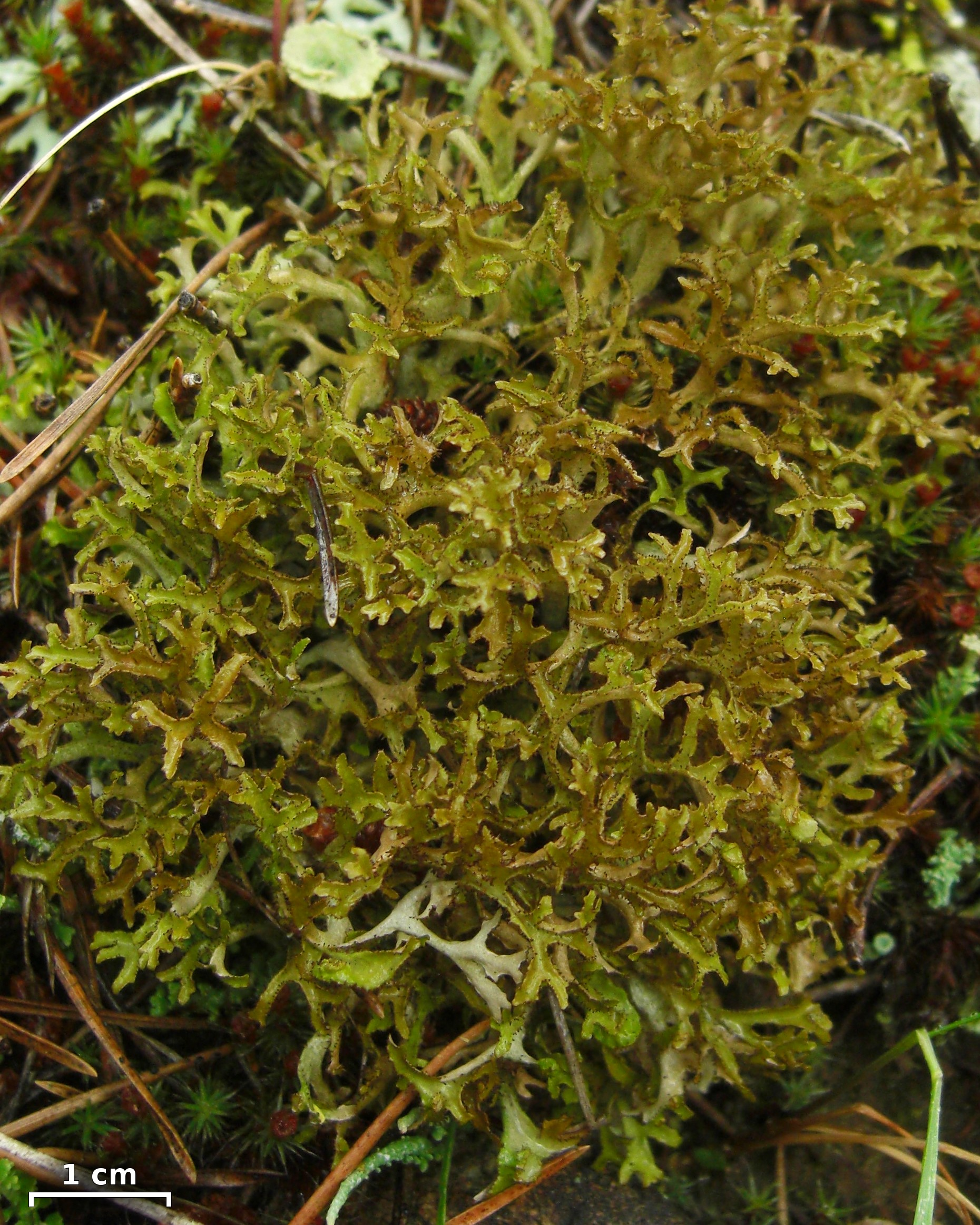

Scientific classification
- Kingdom: Fungi
- Division: Ascomycota
- Class: Lecanoromycetes
- Order: Lecanorales
- Family: Parmeliaceae
- Genus: Cetraria
- Species: C. ericetorum

Binomial name
- Cetraria ericetorum Opiz (1852)

= Cetraria ericetorum =

Species of lichen-forming fungus

Cetraria ericetorum is a species of rock-dwelling, lichen-forming fungus in the family Parmeliaceae. It occurs in Europe and North America.

== Taxonomy ==
The species was validly published by the Czech-German botanist and forester Philipp Maximilian Opiz. He had published the species earlier in 1823, but that earlier mention was not validly published because it was unaccompanied by a description or diagnosis, so the name dates from its valid publication in 1852.

In molecular studies, Cetraria ericetorum has often been treated with Cetraria islandica as part of the C. islandica species complex. An nrITS-based phylogenetic study published in 1998 found that European and North American material of Cetraria ericetorum differed at only a few DNA positions, and that C. ericetorum and C. islandica were only weakly separated. A later study likewise found that the widely used nrITS barcode did not reliably distinguish the two species, although the RPB2 barcode separated C. islandica from C. ericetorum with a barcode gap.

== Description ==
Cetraria ericetorum can be separated from the similar Cetraria islandica by its narrower, channelled lobes and by pseudocyphellae restricted to the lobe margins. All standard chemical spot tests are negative.

== Habitat and distribution ==
In North America, Cetraria ericetorum occurs in Canada and the United States. In Poland, it grows on soil in nutrient-poor sandy habitats, including psammophilous grasslands, heathlands, and young pine plantations. It was regarded as relatively frequent in the Polish lowlands during the 20th century, but more recent authors describe it as scattered. In Poland, the species is under strict legal protection and is listed as a near-threatened species on the national red list. In the Chuvash Prisurye region of European Russia, the species has been reported as a rare glacial relict near the southern edge of its range, where it occurs on soil in a lichen-rich green-moss pine forest. At one site it was recorded growing with Peltigera malacea, Peltigera rufescens, and Cladonia rangiferina.
