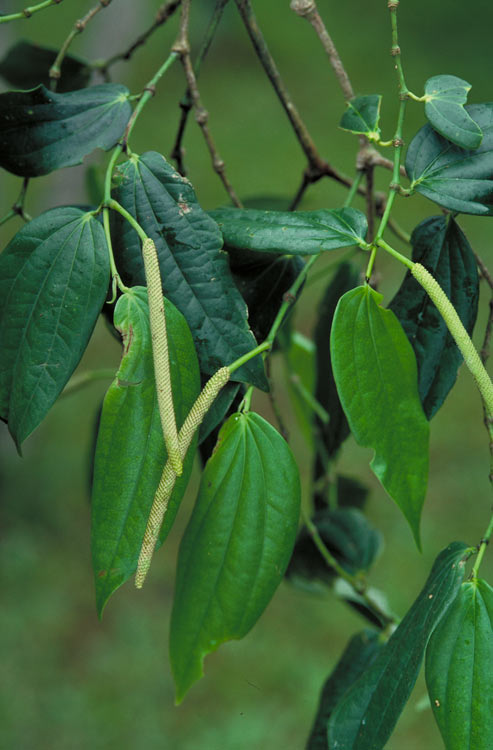

Conservation status
- Least Concern (NCA)

Scientific classification
- Kingdom: Plantae
- Clade: Tracheophytes
- Clade: Angiosperms
- Clade: Magnoliids
- Order: Piperales
- Family: Piperaceae
- Genus: Piper
- Species: P. interruptum

Binomial name
- Piper interruptum Opiz

Synonyms
- Piper abraense C.DC.; Piper clemensiae C.DC.; Piper cumingianum Miq.; Piper ellipticibaccum C.DC.; Piper laevirameum C.DC.; Piper loheri C.DC.; Piper pilispicum C.DC.; Piper pulogense C.DC.; Piper samaranum C.DC.; Piper triandrum F.Muell.

= Piper interruptum =

Species of flowering plant

Piper interruptum is a vine in the pepper family Piperaceae, native to the eastern parts of Southeast Asia and to Melanesia and Queensland.

== Description ==
Piper interruptum is a root climber with a maximum stem diameter of 2 cm (0.79 in). The leaves are ovate to narrowly ovate and mostly glabrous. They measure up to 16 cm (6.3 in) long by 8.5 cm (3.3 in) wide, with a cuneate base which is often asymmetric, and an acuminate tip. There are 1 to 3 pairs of lateral veins, all of which divert from the midvein in the basal portion of the leaf. Petioles are 1 to 2 cm (0.39 to 0.79 in) long and stipules are 0.7 to 0.9 cm (0.28 to 0.35 in) long.

This species is dioecious, meaning that pistillate (functionally female) and staminate (functionally male) flowers are borne on separate plants. The inflorescences are leaf-opposed, pendulous spikes, around 0.4 cm (0.16 in) wide on a peduncle 1 to 2 cm (0.39 to 0.79 in) long. The flowers are minute, just 0.5 mm (0.020 in) wide, and they lack both sepals and petals. Male spikes are 5 to 12 cm (2.0 to 4.7 in) long with the flowers densely clustered along its length, while female spikes are 7 to 19 cm (2.8 to 7.5 in) long and the flowers are arranged in two helical lines.

The black fruit are, in botanical terms, berries around 4 mm (0.16 in) long and 5 mm (0.20 in) wide. They contain a single brown seed.

=== Phenology ===
In Australia, flowering occurs from January to February, and fruits ripen from June to August.

=== Phytochemistry ===
The compounds crotepoxide, eupomatene and pipercallosine have been extracted from the stems of this plant.

== Taxonomy ==
This species was first described by the Czech-German botanist Philipp Maximilian Opiz in 1828, his description was published in volume 1 of Carl Borivoj Presl's book Reliquiae Haenkeanae, seu, Descriptiones et icones plantarum.

=== Etymology ===
The species epithet is from the Latin interruptus, meaning "broken apart" or "interrupted". Opiz wrote in his description spadicibus cylindricus laxis, interruptis − "spadix cylindrical, lax, interrupted" − but it is unclear what he meant by the term.

== Distribution and habitat ==
The distribution of this species is from Taiwan south to the Philippines, New Guinea, the Bismarck Archipelago, the Solomon Islands, Vanuatu and Queensland. In Queensland it occurs on the northeast coast from Cape Tribulation south to Mackay in rainforest, monsoon forest and closed beach/coastal forest, often on soils derived from basalt. The altitude range is from sea level to about 800 m (2,600 ft).

== Conservation ==
This species is listed by the Queensland Department of Environment and Science as least concern. As of 23 January 2024, it has not been assessed by the IUCN.

== Uses ==
In parts of Asia this species has been used as an anti-flatulent, an emollient to relieve coughing and an antiseptic.

== Gallery ==
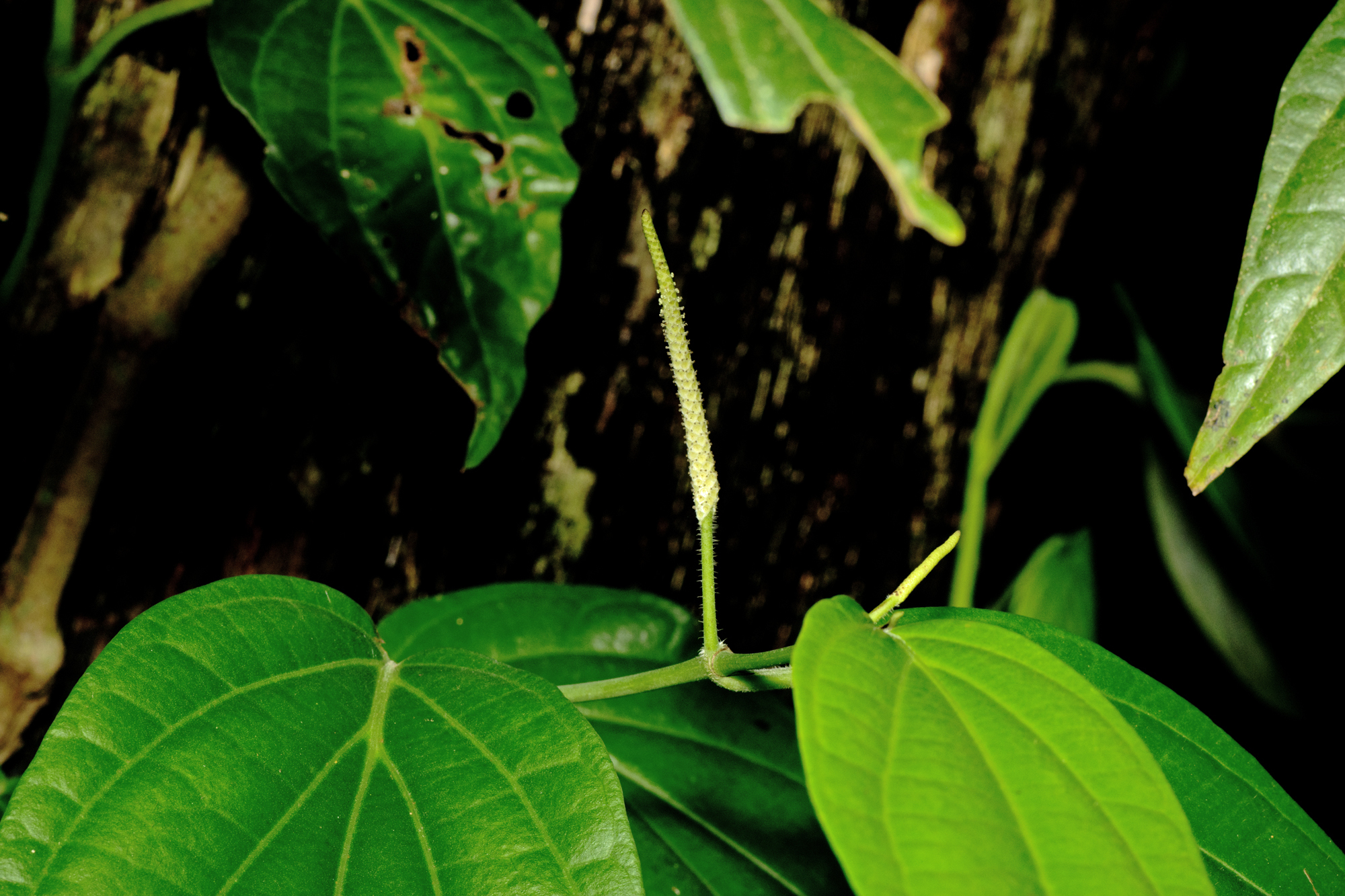
Foliage and flower spike

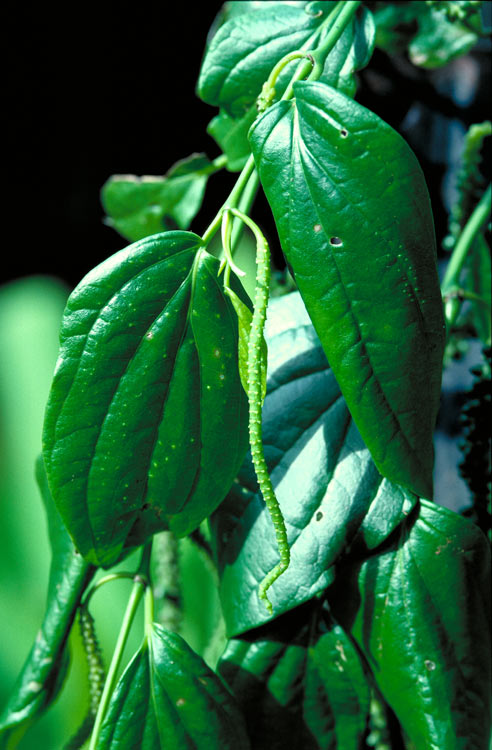
Foliage and flowers

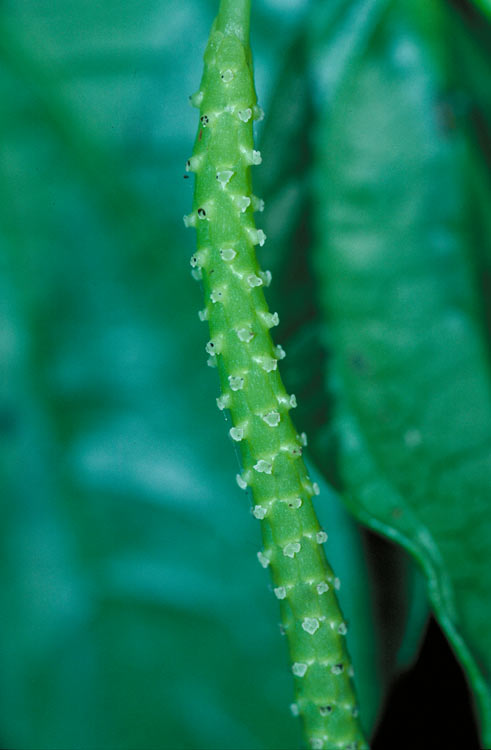
Female flowers

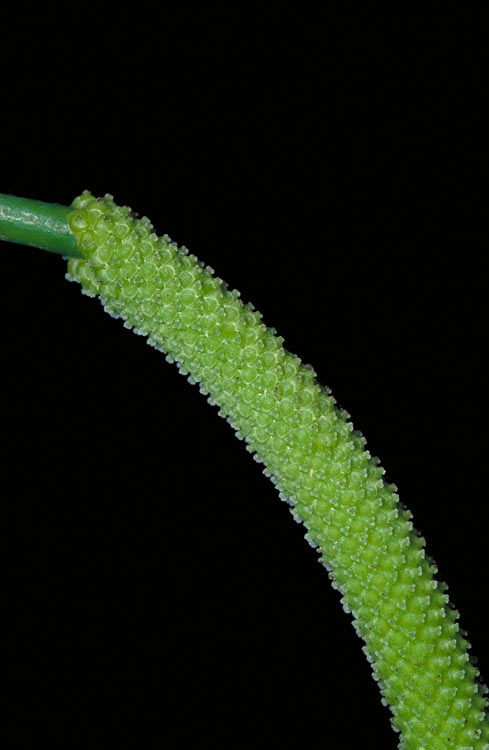
Male flowers

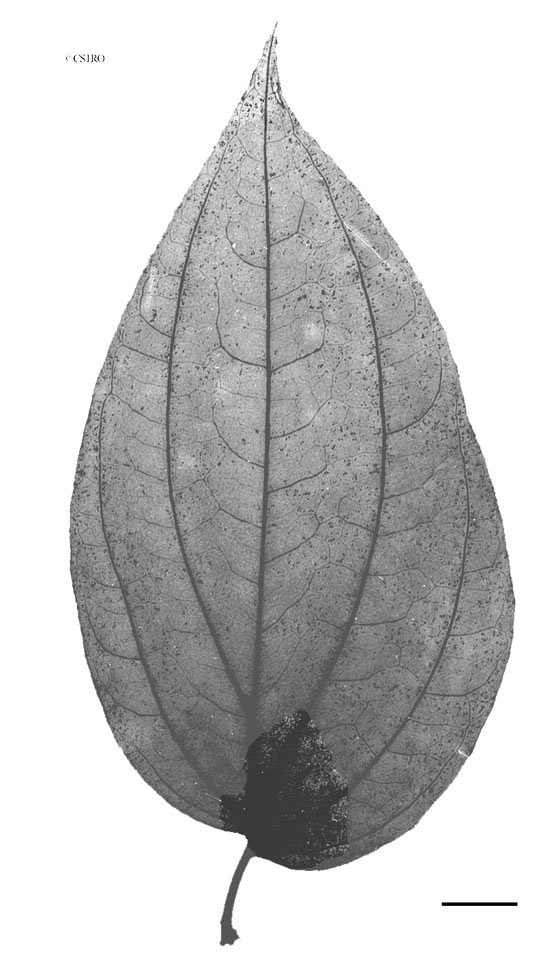
X-ray of leaf
