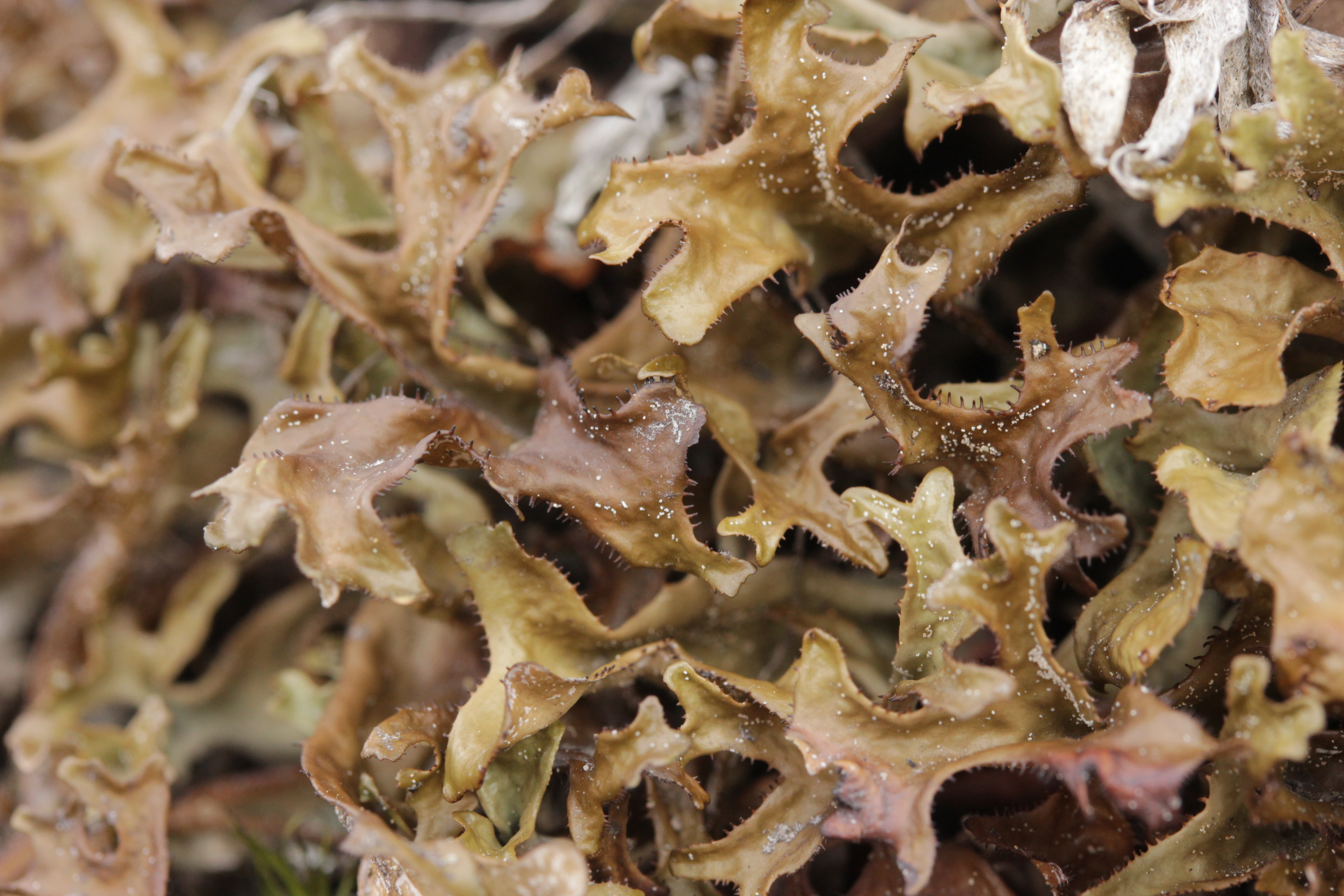
- Iceland moss – Cetraria islandica

Scientific classification
- Kingdom: Fungi
- Division: Ascomycota
- Class: Lecanoromycetes
- Order: Lecanorales
- Family: Parmeliaceae
- Genus: Cetraria; Ach. (1803)

Type species
- Cetraria islandica (L.) Ach. (1803)

Synonyms
- List: Squamaria Hoffm. (1789); Platisma Hoffm. (1796); Geissodea Vent. (1799); Platyphyllum Vent. (1799); Coelocaulon Link (1833); Cetraria sect. Platysma Körb. (1859); Pseudocornicularia Gyeln. (1933); Cetrariomyces E.A.Thomas (1939)

= Cetraria =

Genus of lichen-forming fungi

Cetraria is a genus of fruticose lichens that associate with green algae as photobionts. Most species are found at high latitudes, occurring on sand or heath, and are characterised by their "strap-like" form with spiny lobe edges. The lobes can range from narrow and linear to broader and flattened, often forming loose or densely packed cushions. Their distinctive spiny margins serve both a defensive role and aid in vegetative reproduction through fragmentation. The genus was created by Erik Acharius in 1803 and belongs to the large family Parmeliaceae. While originally a species-rich genus, taxonomic revisions since the 1960s have split many species into new genera, though the exact circumscription remains debated among lichenologists.

Several Cetraria species have cultural and economic importance, particularly C. islandica (Iceland moss), which has been widely used in European traditional medicine for treating digestive and respiratory ailments. This species was also historically important as a famine food in Northern Europe and continues to find applications in modern cosmetics and pharmaceutical products. Cetraria species are also ecologically important, serving as indicators of air quality and climate change due to their sensitivity to environmental conditions and ability to accumulate various elements, including potentially toxic heavy metals and radioactive isotopes.

== Systematics ==
=== Historical development (1800s–1950s) ===
The taxonomic history of lichens now known as "cetrarioid" (characterised by their strap-like thalli and typically having marginal apothecia) begins with Carl Linnaeus, who in his 1753 work Species Plantarum included five species (later recognised as cetrarioid lichens) within his broad concept of the genus Lichen. These species, including L. islandicus (now Cetraria islandica), would later be recognised as distinct from other lichens based on their unique characteristics. The genus Cetraria was circumscribed by the Swedish lichenologist Erik Acharius in 1803. He noted that its apothecia (fruiting bodies) were intermediate between the scutellate and peltate types found in related genera, which along with other morphological features meant that species in this genus could not be properly placed in either Parmelia or Peltidea. He assigned Cetraria islandica as the type species, and included an additional seven species in his original circumscription: C. cucullata, C. nivalis, C. lacunosa, C. fallax, C. glauca, C. sepincola, and C. juniperina. Of these eight, only the type and C. sepincola remain in the genus.

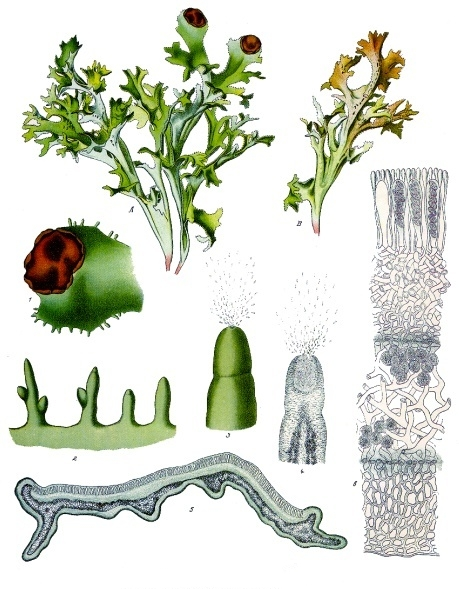
Historical illustration of Cetraria islandica from Köhler's Medicinal Plants (1887), showing thallus morphology and anatomical details. This species serves as the type species of the genus Cetraria.

In 1860, William Nylander began the first major taxonomic reorganisation of Cetraria, retaining only five species in the genus while moving 25 species to his newly described genus Platisma ("Platysma") and one species to Dactylina. Although new genera were subsequently established—including Nephromopsis by Johannes Müller Argoviensis (1891) and Tuckermannopsis by Vilmos Kőfaragó-Gyelnik (1933)—most lichenologists continued to favour a broader concept of Cetraria. This broader interpretation was reflected in mid-20th century treatments, with Kseniya Aleksandrovna Rassadina including 76 species in the genus, while Veli Räsänen recognising 62 species shortly after.

=== Modern revisions (1960s–2000s) ===
Cetraria remained a broad and species-rich genus until the 1960s, when taxonomic revisions began splitting it into new genera. The development of molecular phylogenetics techniques revealed previously unknown evolutionary relationships, leading to extensive reclassification. This process started with the description of Asahinea and Platismatia, and continued over subsequent decades with the recognition of additional genera including Masonhalea, Ahtiana, Allocetraria, Vulpicida, Cetrariella, Arctocetraria, and Flavocetraria, among others. Species delimitation within the genus has proven particularly challenging, as genetic analysis often reveals minimal genetic distances between morphologically distinct groups. In 1992–1993, Ingvar Kärnefelt further reorganised cetrarioid classification, erecting ten new genera. In 2013, Andres Saag and colleagues accepted 38 species of Cetraria in their world list of 149 cetrarioid lichens.

The phylogenetic understanding of these cetrarioid relationships soon faced new challenges. A 2009 molecular study demonstrated that only about 90 species distributed across 14 genera formed a true monophyletic "cetrarioid core" within Parmeliaceae. By 2011, researchers found that approximately half of the accepted genera within this core group were not actually monophyletic, suggesting the existing classification required further refinement. Their analyses revealed that many cetrarioid genera had been more narrowly circumscribed than comparable groups within Parmeliaceae, leading to debates about whether some previously split taxa should be reunited.

=== Current classification debates ===
In 2017, Divakar and colleagues used a "temporal phylogenetic" approach to identify temporal bands for specific taxonomic ranks in the family Parmeliaceae, suggesting that groups of species that diverged within the time window of 29.45–32.55 million years ago represent genera. They proposed to synonymise Allocetraria (and several other genera) with Cetraria, because the former group of species originated relatively recently and fell under the timeframe threshold for genus level. The net result of this proposal was to reduce 13 previously accepted genera in the cetrarioid clade down to two. This approach received mixed responses from the lichenological community. The synonymy was not accepted in a later critical analysis of this technique for lichen systematics. Arve Elvebakk and colleagues expressed a similar opinion, stating that they would "prefer a model of 13 imperfectly defined cetrarioid core genera in addition to 'orphaned' species, over an alternative of only two widely defined ones, as a starting point for further phylogenetic studies".

Thell and Divakar (2022) later argued that the revised generic circumscription of Cetraria and Nephromopsis should be accepted, as the alternative would require division into further new genera. They noted this arrangement is supported by characters of conidia and ascospores. However, some researchers maintain that strict application of temporal phylogenetics methodology for genus delimitation in the Parmeliaceae could have important implications for conservation legislation. For pragmatic reasons, some authorities retain genera such as Cetrariella and Vulpicida (which Divakar et al. included within Cetraria), and Flavocetraria and Tuckermannopsis (which they included within Nephromopsis).

A pragmatic approach to this taxonomic complexity appears in Bruce McCune and Linda Geiser's 2023 field guide to Pacific Northwest macrolichens, where they adopt a broad concept of Cetraria (including Nephromopsis) based on available molecular and morphological data, while acknowledging that generic placement within cetrarioid lichens remains unsettled. Their treatment reflects the ongoing challenge of reconciling traditional generic concepts with phylogenetic findings.

=== Naming ===
The genus name Cetraria is derived from the Latin cetra, meaning 'a type of leather shield' combined with the suffix -aria, indicating connection or possession. English common names that have been applied to members of the genus include "Iceland lichens", "Icelandmoss", and "heath lichens".

== Description ==
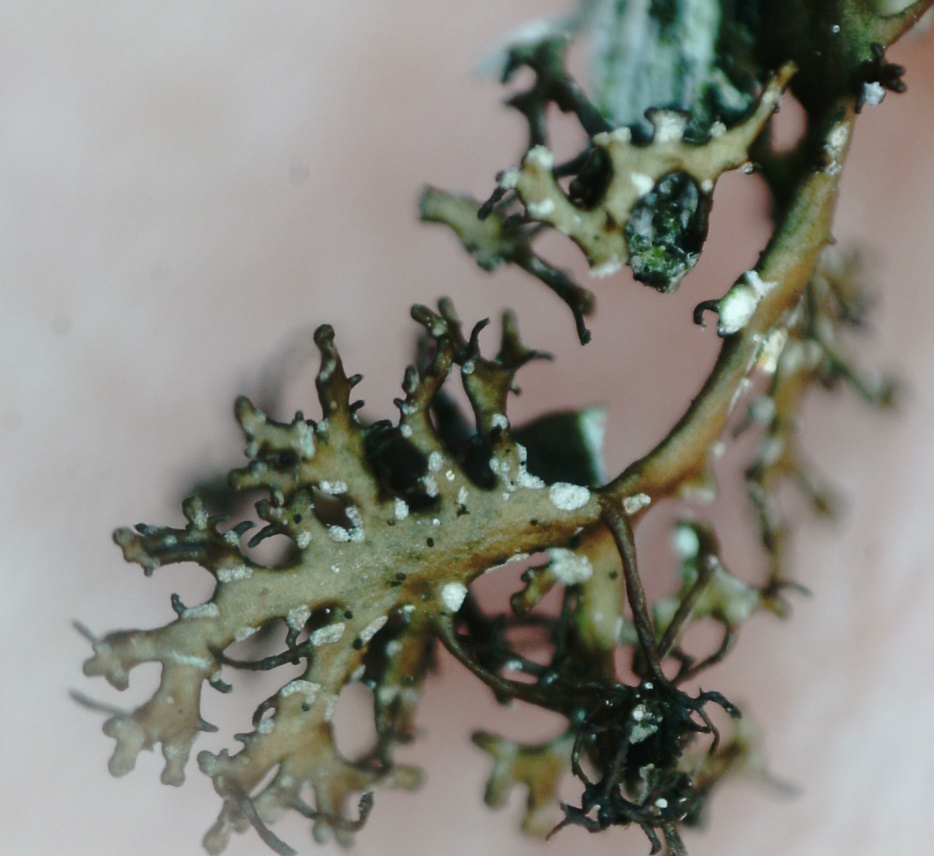
The small-toothed Iceland lichen, Cetraria odontella

Genus Cetraria includes lichens that typically form dorsiventral thalli, which are distinctly differentiated between an upper and lower surface. The thallus can be leaf-like (foliose) and loosely attached to the substrate, often with ascending lobe margins that may form rosette-like patterns, or it can be shrubby and erect (fruticose) with lobes that are channelled, sometimes tubular, and occasionally flat. In some species, the thallus forms conspicuous spine-like projections, growing in tufted clusters. The genus is known to reproduce primarily through vegetative means, with species often propagating through fragmentation of the thallus, which contains both fungal and algal partners. The colour of the thallus varies, ranging from dark brown or olive green to grey-green or even yellowish in certain conditions.

The upper cortex of Cetraria lichens may have one or two layers, with thick-walled hyphal cells forming the external layer. Beneath this lies a more delicate layer of hyphae arranged parallel to the surface (periclinal arrangement). The internal medulla, which forms the core of the thallus, is typically white or bright yellow. Pseudocyphellae (small pores that facilitate gas exchange) are often present on the lower surface or at the margins of the lobes. The lower surface generally lacks rhizines (root-like structures for attachment) or has them only sparsely. Soralia, which are specialised structures for vegetative reproduction, are rarely found.

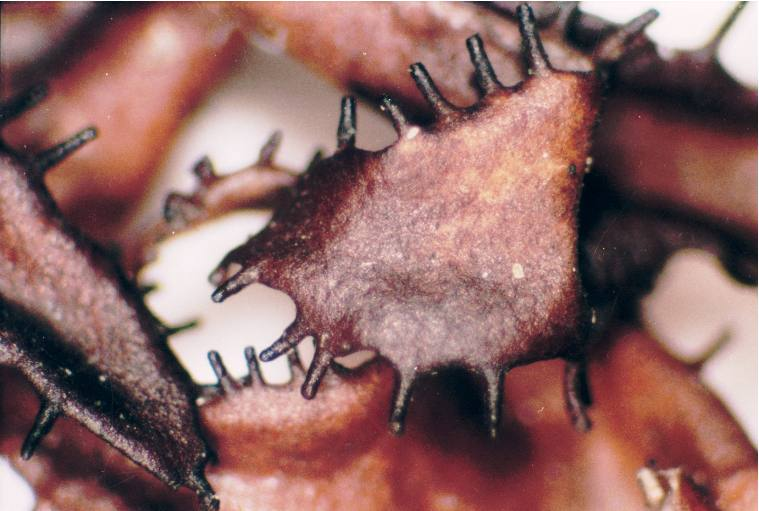
The spiny lobes edges characteristic of the genus are evident in this herbarium specimen of Cetraria laevigata.

The sexual reproductive structures of Cetraria are apothecia (fruiting bodies), typically positioned at the margins of the thallus and often attached at an angle. The margin of the apothecium can sometimes appear notched or crenulate, and the thalline margin (a rim formed by the thallus tissue) is often curved inward. The epithecium, or uppermost layer of the apothecium, is usually red-brown to dark brown. The hymenium (fertile layer) stains blue when exposed to iodine (I+ blue), while the hypothecium (tissue beneath the hymenium) is colourless. The hamathecium, composed of paraphyses (sterile filamentous structures), is typically straight, sparsely branched, with swollen tips.

The asci (spore-producing cells) are eight-spored, narrowly club-shaped (clavate), and feature a moderately large tholus (internal structure) with an apical ring and a conical ocular chamber that may have a narrow to broad beak. This configuration is characteristic of the Lecanora-type ascus. The ascospores are colourless, single-celled (aseptate), and vary in shape from ellipsoidal to nearly spherical (subglobose).

Asexual reproductive structures, the pycnidia, are also present in Cetraria. These are flask-shaped structures that release conidia (asexual spores) through a blackened opening (ostiole). The pycnidia may be located on the surface of the thallus or at the ends of marginal projections. The walls of the pycnidia are two-layered, with the outer layer being thin (around 5 μm thick) and sometimes darkened. The conidia themselves are colourless and may be cylindrical, bottle-shaped, crescent-shaped, or lemon-shaped.

The chemical composition of Cetraria species includes a range of secondary metabolites, such as β-orcinol depsidones (e.g., fumarprotocetraric acid, norstictic acid, gyrophoric acid, and hiascinic acid), fatty acids (lichesterinic and protolichesterinic acids), as well as usnic acid and derivatives of pulvinic acid in some species. These compounds contribute to the lichen's defence mechanisms and other ecological roles.

=== Photobiont ===
The primary photobiont (photosynthetic partner) in Cetraria is a trebouxioid or chlorococcoid green alga. The interaction between fungal and algal partners in this genus has been particularly well-studied in C. aculeata, providing insights into how these symbiotic relationships function. Research has shown that the genetic structure of photobiont populations is strongly influenced by climate, while also being affected by co-dispersal with their fungal partners. This suggests that species in the genus can potentially extend their ecological range through selective association with locally-adapted photobionts, though the frequency of photobiont switching appears to be limited. Research using high-throughput sequencing has revealed that individual Cetraria thalli can contain heterogeneous populations of photobionts rather than a single genotype. These photobiont communities can be shared between different lichen species growing in the same habitat, particularly in harsh climatic conditions. The ability to maintain diverse photobiont populations within a single thallus, combined with both vegetative reproduction and the capacity to acquire new photobionts, may help explain how species in this genus successfully colonise diverse environments.

== Habitat, distribution, and ecology ==
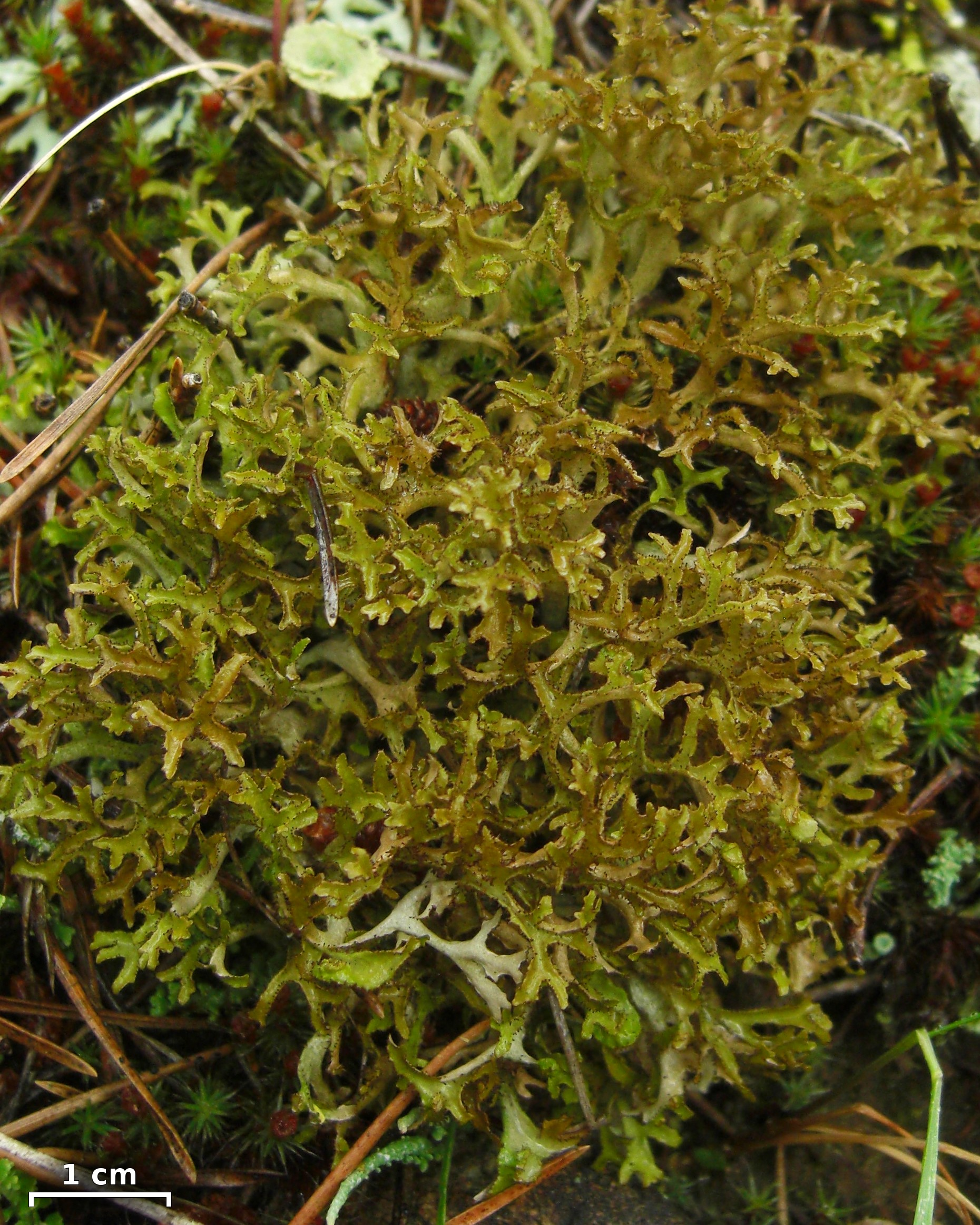
Cetraria ericetorum

The genus Cetraria has a primarily Northern Hemisphere distribution, with species concentrated in North America and Eurasia. However, some species follow more restricted distribution patterns, including bipolar, circumboreal, circumpolar, and amphi-Beringian distributions. The genus shows extensive habitat diversity, with species found from Arctic tundra to Mediterranean scrublands. In India, 16 species are to occur in India, with most found in the Himalayas.

Most Cetraria species grow as either corticolous (on tree bark) or terricolous (on soil) lichens, though some species like C. odontella and C. ericetorum can be found on rocks (saxicolous). A few species, such as C. kamczatica, grow on moss beds (muscicolous). This diversity in substrate preferences helps explain the genus's broad ecological distribution.

The genus includes both widespread and endemic species. Cetraria aculeata and C. muricata are among the most cosmopolitan, found across four continents and many oceanic islands. In contrast, several species have highly restricted ranges – C. annae and C. rassadinae are endemic to Russia's Baikal region, while C. australiensis is found only in southeastern Australia. C. crespoae occurs exclusively in western parts of the Iberian Peninsula and Italy, and C. peruviana is limited to central South America.

Some Cetraria species serve as important ecological indicators. They are particularly sensitive to air quality, with species like C. islandica capable of detecting high levels of sulfur dioxide and fluoride. The genus also shows promise in monitoring climate change impacts, as different species have varying sensitivities to temperature, ultraviolet light exposure, and humidity levels. Cetraria species play a role in ecosystem health through their ability to absorb and accumulate various elements, including potentially toxic metals and radioactive isotopes.

The genus exhibits evolutionary patterns linked to different climatic conditions. For example, the bipolar distribution pattern of C. aculeata appears to have originated in the Northern Hemisphere, with subsequent dispersal to Antarctica and South America during the Pleistocene. Some species, like C. islandica, have developed subspecies adapted to different geographic regions – subsp. islandica in high latitudes of both hemispheres, subsp. crispiformis in northern and eastern Europe, Siberia and North America, and subsp. antarctica in the Southern Hemisphere.

Cetraria species also participate in complex symbiotic relationships. Recent studies have revealed that beyond the primary fungal-algal symbiosis, some species harbour distinct bacterial communities. For instance, C. aculeata associates with alphaproteobacterial communities, while C. islandica hosts Acetobacteraceae and Acidobacteriaceae communities.

== Species ==
As of December 2024, Species Fungorum (in the Catalogue of Life) accepts 17 species of Cetraria. This is similar to the 15 species recognised in "The 2024 Outline of Fungi", in which Allocetraria, Cetrariella, Usnocetraria, and Vulpicida are folded into synonymy with Cetraria. Historically, many more species names have been associated with the genus. For instance, in the mid-20th century, Rassadina included 76 species, while Räsänen recognised 62 species. The current lower number reflects taxonomic revisions since the 1960s that have moved many species to other genera, though the exact circumscription remains debated among lichenologists.

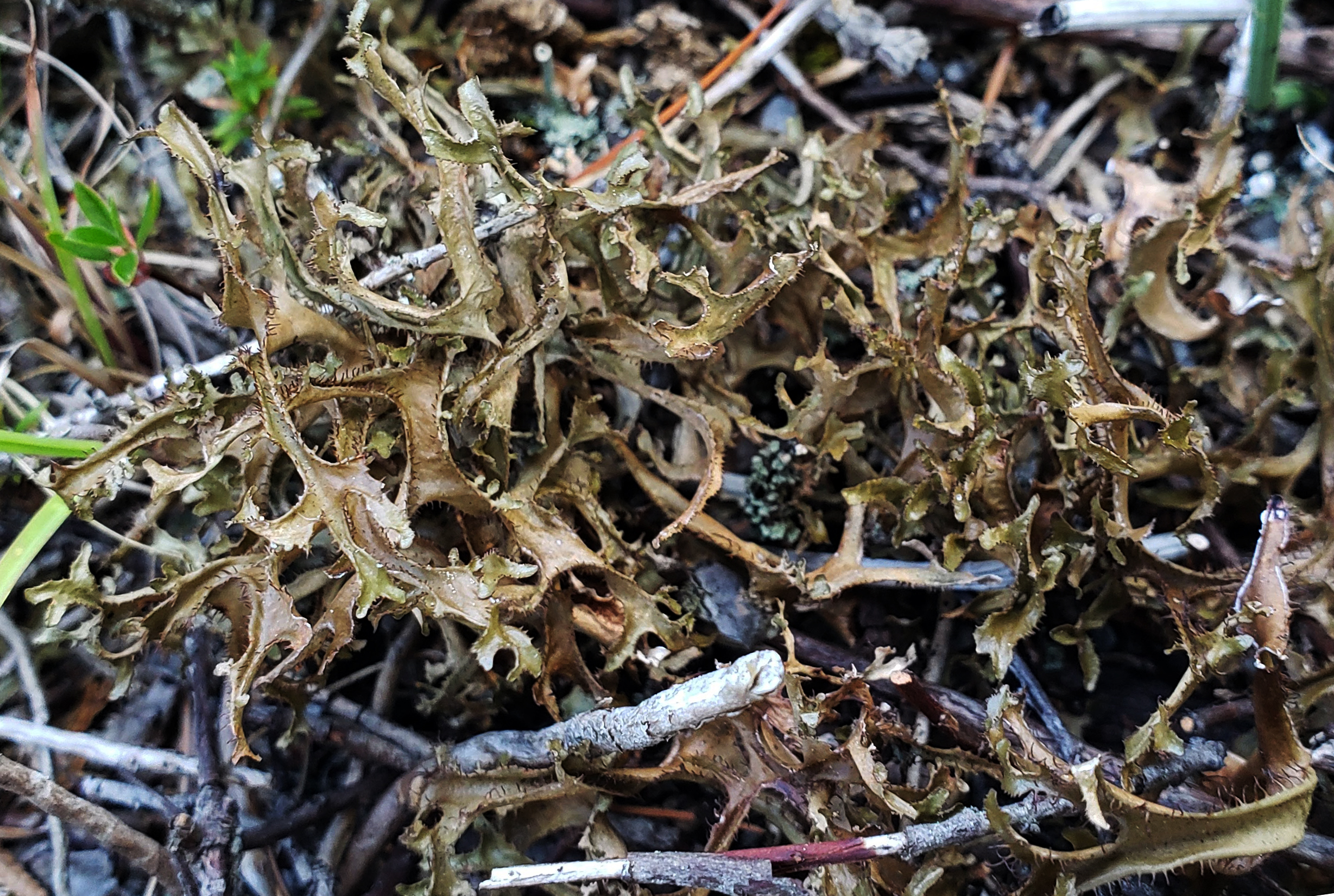
Cetraria arenaria

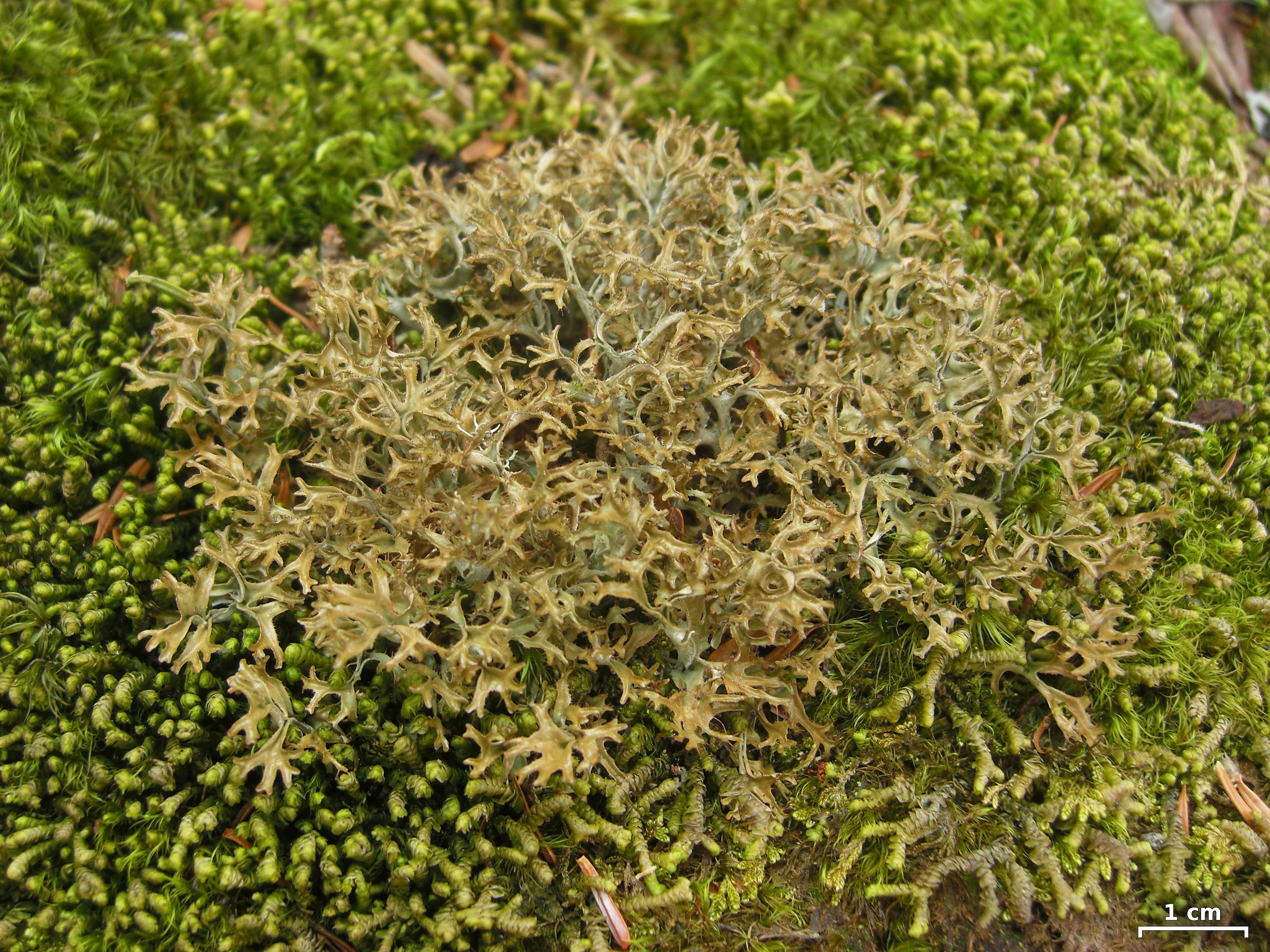
Cetraria laevigata

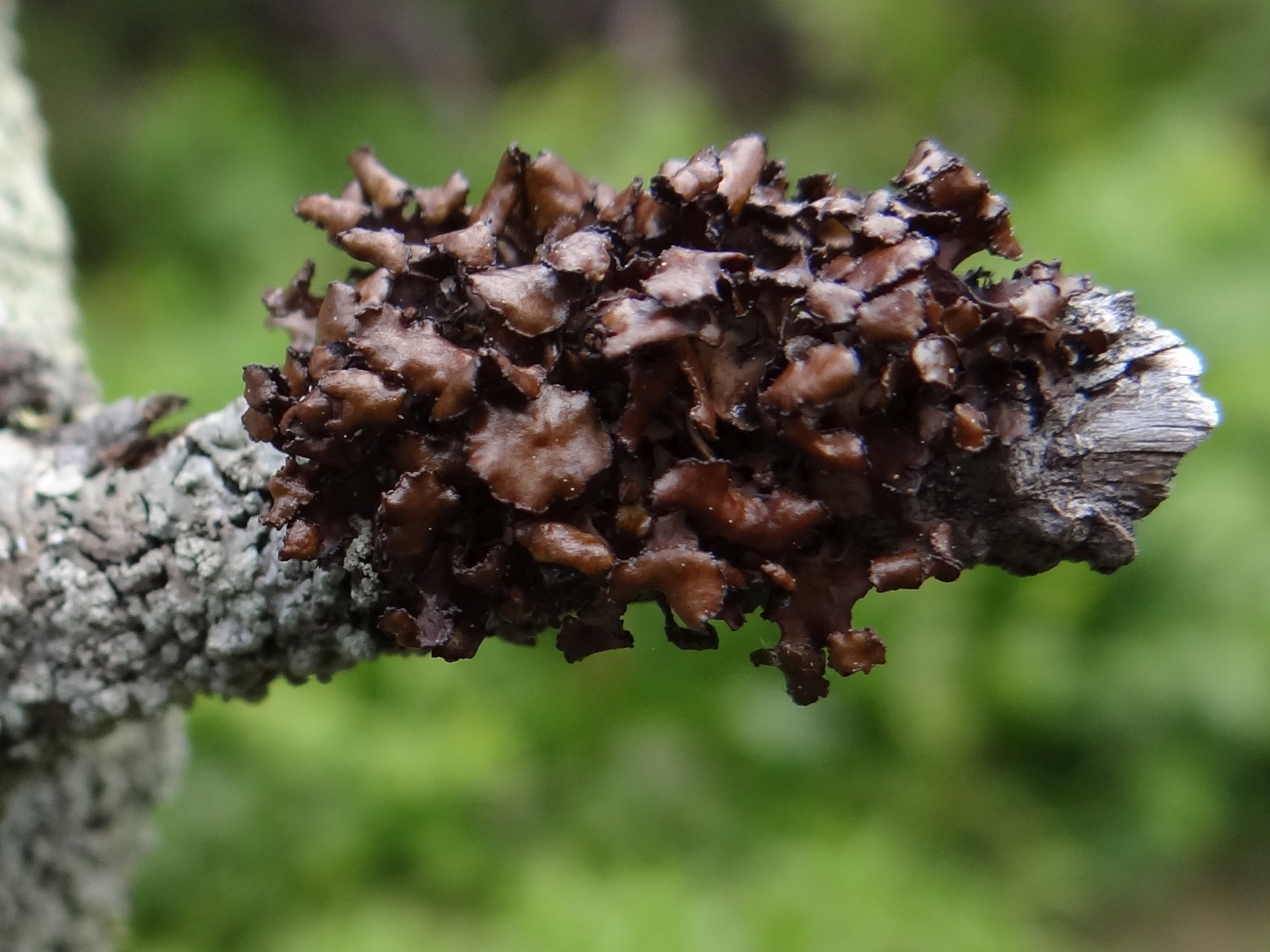
Cetraria sepincola

- Cetraria aculeata (Schreb.) Fr. (1826)
- Cetraria agnata (Nyl.) Kristinsson (1974)
- Cetraria ambigua C.Bab. (1852)
- Cetraria annae Oxner (1933)
- Cetraria arenaria Kärnefelt (1977)
- Cetraria australiensis W.A.Weber ex Kärnefelt (1977)
- Cetraria corrugata (R.F.Wang, X.L.Wei & J.C.Wei) Divakar, A.Crespo & Lumbsch (2017)
- Cetraria crespoae (Barreno & Vázquez) Kärnefelt (1993)
- Cetraria crispiformis (Räsänen) Makryǐ (2022)
- Cetraria endochrysea (Lynge) Divakar, A.Crespo & Lumbsch (2017)
- Cetraria ericetorum Opiz (1852)
- Cetraria flavonigrescens (A.Thell & Randlane) Divakar, A.Crespo & Lumbsch (2017)
- Cetraria isidiigera (Kurok. & M.J.Lai) Divakar, A.Crespo & Lumbsch (2017)
- Cetraria islandica (L.) Ach. (1803)
- Cetraria kamczatica Savicz (1914)
- Cetraria laevigata Rass. (1943)
- Cetraria laii Divakar, A.Crespo & Lumbsch (2017)
- Cetraria minuscula (Elenkin & Savicz) McCune (2018)
- Cetraria muricata (Ach.) Eckfeldt (1895)
- Cetraria nepalensis D.D.Awasthi (1957)
- Cetraria nigricans Nyl (1859)
- Cetraria odontella (Ach.) Ach. (1814)
- Cetraria peruviana Kärnefelt & A.Thell (1993)
- Cetraria platyphylla Tuck. (1882)
- Cetraria racemosa (Lynge) Øvstedal (2009)
- Cetraria rassadinae Makryĭ (1984)
- Cetraria sepincola (Hoffm.) Ach. (1803)
- Cetraria sinensis (X.Q.Gao) Divakar, A.Crespo & Lumbsch (2017)
- Cetraria sphaerosporella (Müll.Arg.) McCune (2022)
- Cetraria wangii Divakar, A.Crespo & Lumbsch (2017)
- Cetraria weii Divakar, A.Crespo & Lumbsch (2017)

The taxon once known as Cetraria subscutata D.C.Linds. (1973) was placed into synonymy with Nephromopsis chlorophylla in 2018.

== Chemistry ==
The chemical composition of Cetraria species represents a complex array of primary and secondary metabolites, with the latter being particularly distinctive. The genus is characterised by several major classes of compounds, including dibenzofuran derivatives (like usnic acid), depsidones (such as fumarprotocetraric and protocetraric acids), and fatty acids (including lichesterinic and protolichesterinic acids).

Unlike other lichen genera such as Parmotrema or Usnea, which show considerable interspecific variation in their chemical profiles, Cetraria has relatively consistent patterns in its secondary metabolite composition. While depsides like atranorin and squamatic acid appear as minor compounds in species like C. annae, they are not characteristic of the genus.

The aliphatic acids are particularly abundant in Cetraria species. Beyond the common protolichesterinic and lichesterinic acids, some species produce more specialised compounds. For instance, C. nigricans and C. odontella synthesise rangiformic acid, while C. obtusata produces secalonic acid. Environmental factors can influence the production of these compounds, as demonstrated by the variation in norstictic acid concentrations in C. aculeata populations growing in Mediterranean and central Asian regions. Several quinone pigments have been isolated from the red thallus tips of Cetraria laevigata, including skyrin, graciliformin, cuculoquinone, and islandoquinone.

Cetraria islandica has been the most extensively studied species chemically. Beyond its secondary metabolites, its primary metabolites include distinctive polysaccharides, particularly lichenin (β-1,3/1,4-D-glucan) and isolichenin (α-1,3/1,4-glucan). The ratio of β-1,3/1,4-D-glucans in C. islandica's mycobiont cell wall exceeds that found in barley and oats. Other identified polysaccharides include alkali-soluble galactomannan and various soluble polysaccharides.

The chemical constituents of Cetraria species play crucial roles in their environmental adaptation and global distribution. For example, fumarprotocetraric acid in C. islandica contributes to heavy metal tolerance by reducing metal ion absorption in the apoplast and aids in SO_{2} pollution tolerance. Recent studies have also highlighted the importance of melanins (particularly allomelanins) in these lichens, which provide essential UV protection and may contribute to survival in harsh conditions. This UV-protective role has been demonstrated in C. islandica, where melanins absorb both UV-B and photosynthetically active radiation.

The synthesis of these compounds appears to be influenced by various environmental factors, with species showing chemical variations based on their geographic location and exposure to different environmental stressors. This chemical adaptability has likely contributed to the genus's successful colonisation of diverse habitats across different climatic zones.

== Traditional uses ==
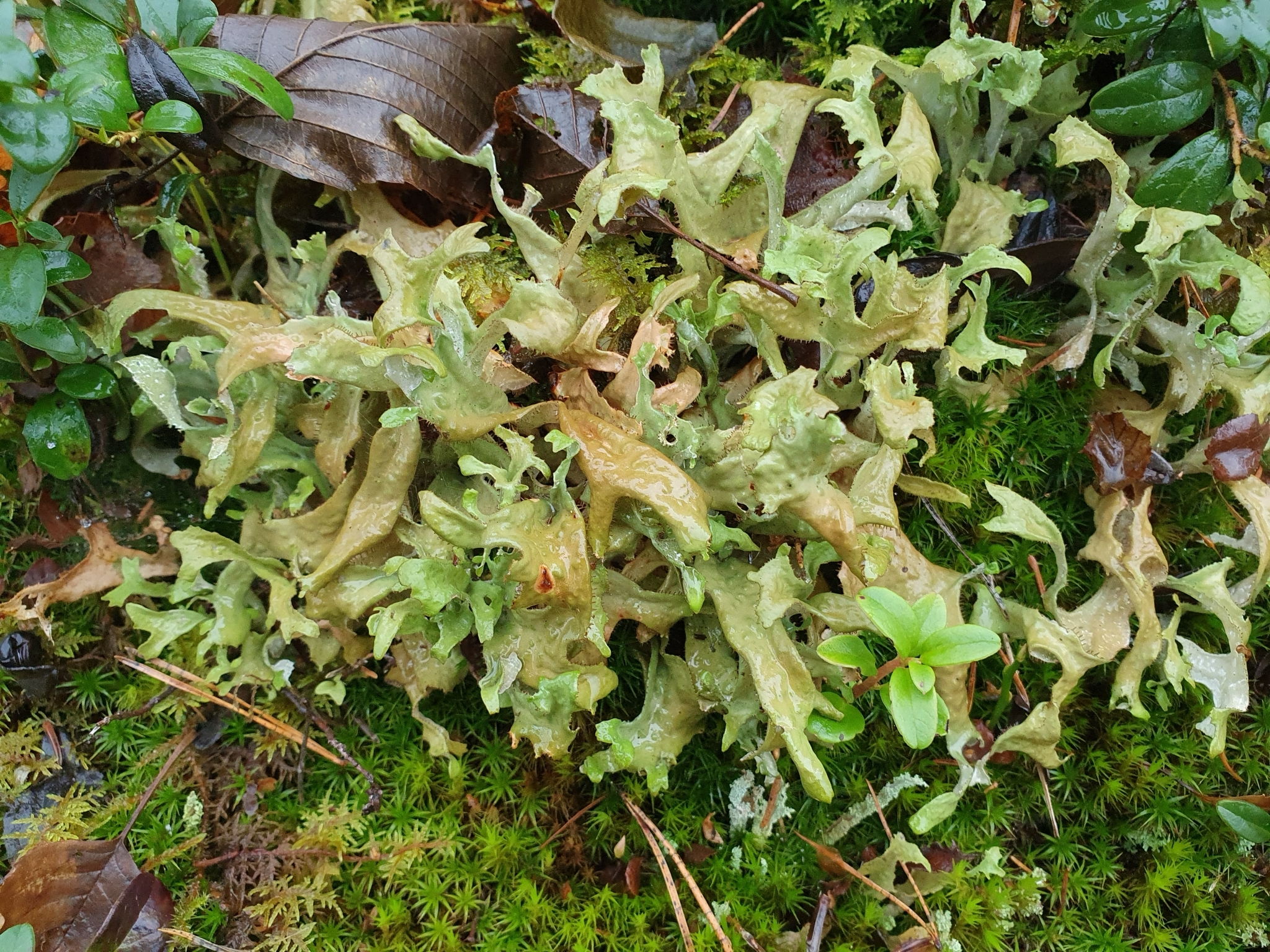
Cetraria islandica

Within the genus Cetraria, C. islandica stands out for its extensive history of traditional medicinal applications. Throughout Europe, this species was primarily employed to treat digestive and respiratory ailments. The lichen was prepared in various forms, including decoctions, tinctures, aqueous extracts, and infusions, each tailored to specific therapeutic uses.

Different regions developed distinct medicinal applications for C. islandica. In Iceland, it was used to treat both gastric and duodenal ulcers. Finnish traditional medicine employed it as a remedy for colds. Throughout Central Europe, the lichen gained popularity as both a laxative and antitussive (cough suppressant). In Sweden, its applications extended to treating nephritis and diabetes, while Turkish traditional medicine utilised it as a hemostatic and antihemorrhoidal agent. The lichen was also widely used as a treatment for tuberculosis across multiple European countries, including Spain, France, and Turkey.

Beyond its medicinal applications, C. islandica held significant nutritional value. It served as an important food source, particularly during times of scarcity in Northern Europe, where it was often mixed with rice or flour to make bread. In Iceland, where historically it was a staple food, the lichen was incorporated into various traditional dishes, including soups, porridges, and sausages, and was added to "skyr" (a type of curd). An alcoholic beverage known as "Cetraria islandica schnapps", containing 38% alcohol, was also produced from this species. In Russia during 1942–1943, when beet sugar was scarce, C. islandica was used industrially to extract glucose.

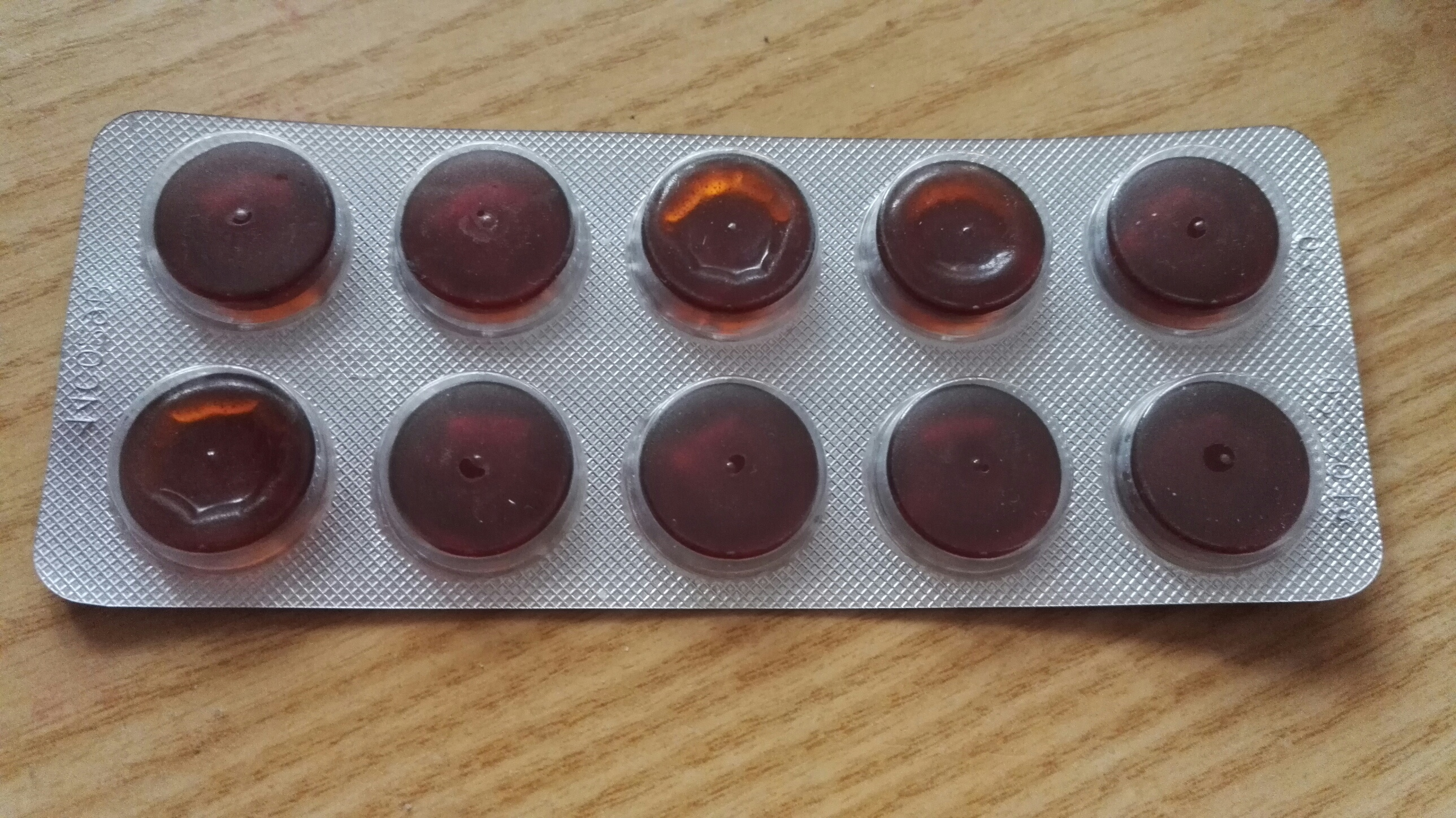
Cetraria islandica tablets

Other species in the genus also had traditional uses. For example, in the Catalan Pyrenees of Spain, Cetraria cucullata was traditionally used to treat asthma. C. ericetorum was utilised as a food flavouring, particularly in soups. During World War II, C. islandica served as livestock feed, particularly for pigs and cows.

The genus has also found applications in cosmetics. C. islandica is incorporated into various personal care products, including shampoos, conditioners, deodorants, toothpastes, and skincare items such as exfoliating and anti-cellulite creams, as well as manicure and pedicure products.

Many of these traditional applications have since been validated through scientific research, particularly the antidiabetic and anti-inflammatory properties. Current research continues to explore new potential therapeutic applications, including cytotoxic and genotoxic/antigenotoxic activities, expanding our understanding of these historically important lichens.

Modern pharmaceutical markets in Europe continue to utilise C. islandica. Multiple medicines derived from the species are approved and commercially available, including syrups, pastilles, and liquid extracts. These products are primarily marketed as treatments for coughs and colds, marketed for their antitussive, expectorant, anti-inflammatory, immunostimulatory and antibacterial effects. The species is also used as an ingredient in various dietary supplements aimed at supporting respiratory health. Several pharmacopoeias, including those of Ukraine, the European Union, Great Britain, and Kazakhstan, include monographs regulating the quality standards for C. islandica raw materials used in medicinal products.

== Environmental monitoring ==
Cetraria species serve as effective biological monitors due to their sensitivity to environmental changes and ability to absorb various substances from their surroundings. Their value in environmental monitoring stems from their lack of a protective cuticle (unlike higher plants) and their air-dependent nutrition, which makes them particularly responsive to atmospheric changes and pollutants. This sensitivity makes them cost-effective tools for large-scale environmental monitoring, especially for studying long-term pollution effects.

Biomonitoring with Cetraria species can be conducted through several approaches: analysing their accumulation of trace elements, studying their biodiversity in specific areas, and examining cell membrane integrity. C. islandica has demonstrated particular effectiveness in bioaccumulating elements such as aluminum, chromium, lithium, magnesium, cadmium, mercury, and lead. Studies have shown that non-living C. islandica can biosorb gold (III) and copper (II) from dilute aqueous solutions at rates of 7.4 mg and 19.2 mg per gram of dried lichen respectively, though the absorption rates vary depending on environmental pH levels.

The presence of specific elements in these lichens can indicate different types of environmental impact. For instance, high levels of aluminum, chromium, lithium, and magnesium typically indicate soil erosion, while elevated levels of cadmium, mercury, or lead suggest anthropogenic (human-caused) pollution. Research in Mediterranean ecosystems has revealed that Cetraria specimens from high-elevation areas often show increased levels of potentially toxic elements, possibly due to long-distance transport and cold condensation processes. The species has also proven valuable in monitoring radioactive contamination, as demonstrated by its use in tracking caesium-137 activity following the Chernobyl disaster.

However, this bioaccumulation capacity raises concerns about the use of Cetraria species, particularly C. islandica, in food and medicinal preparations. The European Food Safety Authority has included C. islandica in its compendium of botanicals that require monitoring when used in food products, leading to the establishment of maximum concentration limits for certain elements in food preparations containing this species.
