= Cetrariella sorediella =

Scientific classification
- Kingdom: Fungi
- Division: Ascomycota
- Class: Lecanoromycetes
- Order: Lecanorales
- Family: Parmeliaceae
- Genus: Cetrariella
- Species: C. sorediella

Binomial name
- Cetrariella sorediella (Lettau) V.J.Rico & A.Thell (2011)

Synonyms
- List: Cetraria commixta f. sorediella Lettau (1918); Cetraria fahlunensis var. sorediella (Lettau) Räsänen (1952); Melanelia commixta var. sorediella (Lettau) Hafellner & Türk (2001); Melanelia sorediella (Lettau) V.J.Rico, van den Boom & Barrasa (2005)

Species of lichen-forming fungus

Cetrariella sorediella is a species foliose (leafy) lichen in the family Parmeliaceae.

== Taxonomy ==
Cetrariella sorediella was first described by Georg Lettau in 1918 as Cetraria commixta f. sorediella (the basionym), treating it as a sorediate form of C. commixta. It was later recombined at different taxonomic ranks and in different genera, including as Cetraria fahlunensis var. sorediella and Melanelia commixta var. sorediella. In 2005 it was raised to species rank as Melanelia sorediella, distinguished from related taxa by characters such as the presence of pycnoisidia and the reported absence of pseudocyphellae and apothecia.

DNA-based studies soon suggested that placing this species in Melanelia did not reflect its relationships. In a five-marker phylogeny of the cetrarioid core, Thell and co-authors found that the taxon treated as "Melanelia sorediella" was the closest relative (sister taxon) of Cetrariella commixta, indicating that the two belong in the same genus. However, they also noted that the precise placement of the pair within Cetrariella was only weakly supported, and that there were no clear non-molecular characters then known that independently tied them to the core Cetrariella species.

A later multi-locus analysis with improved support placed "Melanelia sorediella" within Cetrariella and showed that retaining it in Melanelia was not a workable option because it is distantly related to Melanelia stygia, the type species of that genus. Rico and Thell therefore transferred the species to Cetrariella as Cetrariella sorediella, and supported keeping Cetrariella commixta in the same genus rather than creating a separate genus for the commixta–sorediella lineage.
