= Cetraria australiensis =

Scientific classification
- Domain: Eukaryota
- Kingdom: Fungi
- Division: Ascomycota
- Class: Lecanoromycetes
- Order: Lecanorales
- Family: Parmeliaceae
- Genus: Cetraria
- Species: C. australiensis

Binomial name
- Cetraria australiensis W.A.Weber ex Kärnefelt (1977)

Synonyms
- Coelocaulon australiense W.A.Weber (1975)

Species of lichen

Cetraria australiensis is a species of saxicolous (rock-dwelling), fruticose lichen in the family Parmeliaceae. It occurs in Tasmania, Australia.

== Taxonomy ==
William Alfred Weber first formally described and named this species in 1975. He classified it in the genus Coelocaulon. Ingvar Kärnefelt transferred it to Cetraria in 1977.

== Description ==
Cetraria australiensis features a fruticose (shrub-like) thallus that is decumbent, meaning it lies flat but may rise slightly. It is essentially unattached and forms loose clumps that can spread up to a metre wide. The thallus varies in colour from pale to dark chestnut-brown or even black-brown. The lobes comprising the thallus are flattened and can be up to 2 mm wide, often plane or slightly grooved (canaliculate), and are richly branched in a forked (dichotomous) manner, creating an entangled appearance. The structure is dorsiventral, having distinct upper and lower surfaces, with the lower surface typically a bit paler. The lobe tips (apices) are truncate, and the margins and tips have spine-like projections up to 0.5 mm long. The surface can be glossy to matte and is generally smooth.

Occasional pseudocyphellae, which are small, white, pore-like structures, appear strictly along the margins. Apothecia (fruiting bodies) have not been observed in this species. The conidia, a type of asexual spore, are about 6 by 1 μm in size.

In terms of chemistry, Cetraria australiensis contains lichesterinic and protolichensterinic acids, with all standard spot tests returning negative results.

== Habitat and distribution ==
Cetraria australiensis is highly localised in Tasmania, primarily found at high elevations on the Central Plateau Conservation Area and occasionally recorded in the Ben Lomond area in the North-East. This species is also present in alpine regions of southeastern Australia's mainland. It typically forms extensive, loose mats on the ground within heathland and bolster moor habitats, often intermixed with species of Cladia and Cladonia. The lichen has been severely affected by alpine fires, such as those in the Lake MacKenzie area in 2016. In many locations, its distribution is relict, confined to small, surviving patches of coniferous microshrubbery.
