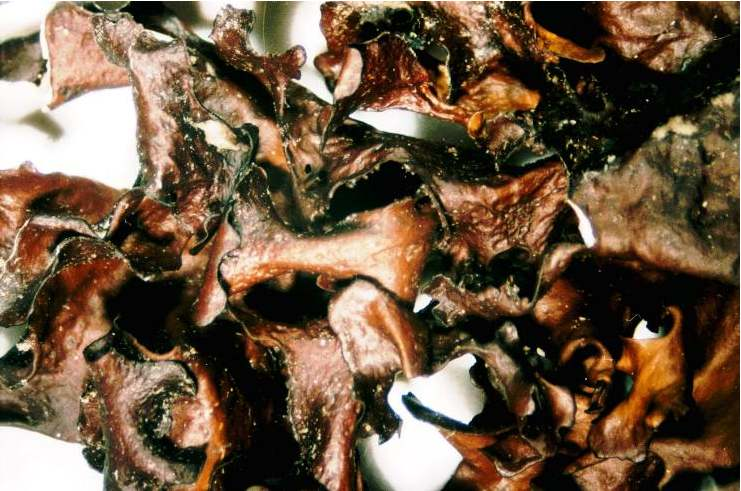
- Arctocetraria andrejevii

Scientific classification
- Domain: Eukaryota
- Kingdom: Fungi
- Division: Ascomycota
- Class: Lecanoromycetes
- Order: Lecanorales
- Family: Parmeliaceae
- Genus: Arctocetraria; Kärnefelt & A.Thell (1993)

Type species
- Arctocetraria andrejevii (Oxner) Kärnefelt & A.Thell (1993)

Species
- A. andrejevii A. nigricascens A. simmonsii

= Arctocetraria =

Genus of lichens

Arctocetraria is a genus of fruticose lichens in the family Parmeliaceae. It has three species.

== Taxonomy ==
The genus Arctocetraria was circumscribed by the lichenologists Ingvar Kärnefelt and Arne Thell in 1993, who separated it from the older genus Cetraria based on distinctive reproductive features. Arctocetraria andrejevii was designated as the type species. The creation of this new genus reflected an improved understanding of evolutionary relationships among cetrarioid lichens, as Arctocetraria species share unique characteristics that set them apart from true Cetraria species, particularly in their spore-producing structures and chemical composition.

The genus originally included two species (A. andrejevii and A. nigricascens), both of which were previously classified under Cetraria but were found to form their own distinct evolutionary lineage. A third species was added to the genus in 2007.

In 2017, Pradeep Divakar and colleagues used a then-recently developed "temporal phylogenetic" approach to identify temporal bands for specific taxonomic ranks in the family Parmeliaceae, suggesting that groups of species that diverged within the time window of 29.45–32.55 million years ago represent genera. They proposed to synonymize Arctocetraria with Nephromopsis, along with several other Parmelioid genera, so that all the genera within the Parmeliaceae are about the same age. Although some of their proposed taxonomic changes were accepted, the synonymisation of the Parmelioid genera with Nephromopsis was not accepted in a later critical analysis of the temporal phylogenetic approach for fungal classification.

== Description ==
Arctocetraria is a genus of fruticose (shrub-like) lichens in the family Parmeliaceae. These lichens grow in an upright, branching form and exhibit colours ranging from dark to pale brown, blackish, or olive-grey, with duller colouring typically appearing at their base. The main body (thallus) of Arctocetraria forms lobes that are either partially folded into channels or nearly tubular in shape. These lobes may become wider toward their tips and sometimes develop a pitted or wrinkled surface texture. Along their edges, the lobes feature scattered branched or unbranched hair-like projections called cilia. The lower surface contains small pores called pseudocyphellae, which appear either along the margins or across the surface.

The outer protective layer (cortex) consists primarily of thick-walled cells arranged in a dense pattern, occasionally with a very thin underlying layer of elongated cells. When present, the reproductive structures (apothecia) develop along the edges of the upper surface. The spore-producing structures (asci) within the apothecia are distinctive for the genus, featuring relatively large central bodies (axial bodies) measuring 1.8–2.0 micrometres in width.

The asexual reproductive structures (pycnidia) appear as small projections along the margins. These produce specialized cells (conidia) that are typically dumbbell-shaped. A key chemical characteristic of the genus is the presence of norrangiformic and rangiformic acids in the lichen tissue.

== Species ==
- Arctocetraria andrejevii (Oxner) Kärnefelt & A.Thell (1993)
- Arctocetraria nigricascens (Nyl.) Kärnefelt & A.Thell (1993)
- Arctocetraria simmonsii (Krog) E.S.Hansen (2007)
