= Cetraria peruviana =

Scientific classification
- Domain: Eukaryota
- Kingdom: Fungi
- Division: Ascomycota
- Class: Lecanoromycetes
- Order: Lecanorales
- Family: Parmeliaceae
- Genus: Cetraria
- Species: C. peruviana

Binomial name
- Cetraria peruviana Kärnefelt & A.Thell (1993)

Species of lichen

Cetraria peruviana is a rare species of fruticose lichen in the family Parmeliaceae. It is known from a single collection in a high-elevation locale in Cusco, Peru.

== Taxonomy ==
Cetraria peruviana was first described by the lichenologists Ingvar Kärnefelt and Arne Thell in 1993. The holotype specimen was collected in Peru's Department of Cusco at an elevation of 4,000 m (13,000 ft) and is housed in the Farlow Herbarium (FH). The species was originally given the unpublished name "Platysma peruvianum" by George Knox Merrill.

Morphologically, C. peruviana shares some characteristics with C. kamczatica, though it has more curved and shorter lobes. It also bears some resemblance to C. nepalensis, but can be distinguished by its less distinctly canaliculate and almost subtubular lobes. The species' placement within the genus Cetraria is supported by its anatomical and chemical features, though mature reproductive structures (ascomata and conidiomata) were not observed in the type specimen.

The species was described during a broader systematic study of cetrarioid lichens, though it is known only from its type collection. While its precise habitat preferences are not documented, it is thought to be terricolous (growing on soil). It is one of several cetrarioid species that are known to occur in a single or few localities of very limited areas only.

== Description ==
Cetraria peruviana is a small, dark brown lichen characterised by curved lobes that reach approximately 1 cm in height. These lobes are relatively narrow, measuring about 1–2 mm in width, and are distinctly dorsiventral (having different upper and lower surfaces) with a channeled or grooved appearance (canaliculate).

The internal structure of C. peruviana is complex, with several distinct layers. The outermost layer, the epicortex, is particularly well-developed on the upper surface (approximately 5 μm thick) and slightly thinner on the lower surface. Beneath this lies the cortical layer, which is 20–30 μm thick and composed of 2–3 layers of thick-walled cells arranged in a tissue-like pattern (paraplectenchymatous). The cells in the outer portion of this layer are notably large, measuring 5–7 μm in diameter.

The interior of the lichen contains scattered algal cells of the genus Trebouxia, which form the photosynthetic partnership essential to the lichen's survival. The central portion (medulla) is loosely structured, containing thick fungal threads (hyphae) measuring about 5 μm that are strongly gelatinised.

Unlike some related species, C. peruviana lacks specialised structures such as cilia (hair-like projections) or projections along its margins, and no pseudocyphellae (small pores for gas exchange) have been observed. The species also shows negative reactions to common chemical spot tests, though it does contain two lichen substances: lichesterinic and protolichesterinic acids.

Reproductive structures, including both sexual (apothecia) and asexual (conidiomata) forms, have not been observed in this species, though some underdeveloped marginal pycnidia (structures that typically produce asexual spores) have been noted.
