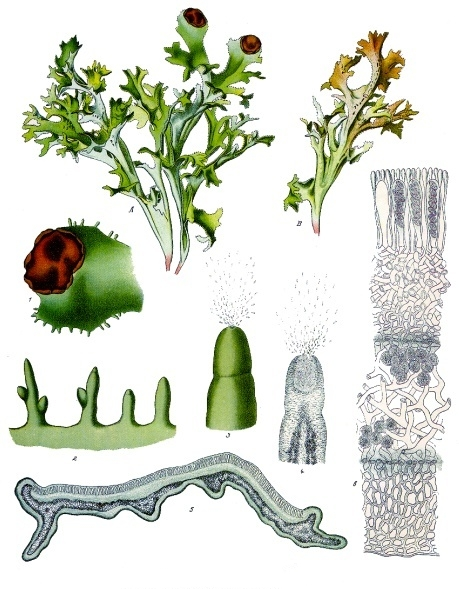

Conservation status
- Secure (NatureServe)

Scientific classification
- Kingdom: Fungi
- Division: Ascomycota
- Class: Lecanoromycetes
- Order: Lecanorales
- Family: Parmeliaceae
- Genus: Cetraria
- Species: C. islandica

Binomial name
- Cetraria islandica (L.) Ach. (1802)

Synonyms
- Lichen islandicus L. (1753)

= Cetraria islandica =

Iceland moss

Species of lichen-forming fungus

Cetraria islandica, also known as true Iceland lichen or Iceland moss, is an Arctic-alpine lichen whose erect or upright, leaflike habit gives it the appearance of a moss, where its name likely comes from.

== Description ==
It is often of a pale chestnut color, but varies considerably, being sometimes almost entirely grayish-white; and grows to a height of from 7.6 to 10.2 centimetres (3 to 4 inches), the branches being channeled into flattened lobes with fringed edges.

=== Chemistry ===
In commerce it is a light-gray harsh cartilaginous body, almost colorless, and tastes slightly bitter. It contains about 70% of lichenin or lichen-starch, a polymeric carbohydrate compound isomeric with common starch. It also yields a peculiar modification of chlorophyll (called thallochlor), fumaric acid, lichenostearic acid, and cetraric acid (which gives it the bitter taste). It also contains lichesterinic acid and protolichesterinic acids.

== Distribution and habitat ==
It grows abundantly in the mountainous regions of northern countries, and it is specially characteristic of the lava slopes and plains of the west and north of Iceland. It is found on the mountains of north Wales, northern England, Scotland and south-west Ireland. In North America its range extends through Arctic regions, from Alaska to Newfoundland, and south in the Rocky Mountains to Colorado, and to the Appalachian Mountains of New England.

== Ecology ==
Cetraria islandica is a known host to the lichenicolous fungus species Lichenopeltella cetrariicola, which is known from Europe and Iceland.

== Uses ==
All parts of the lichen are edible. It may be dry in winter but can be soaked. Boiling reduces the bitterness. It can be added as a thickener to milk or grains or dried and stored.

It is not in great demand, and even in Iceland it is only occasionally used to make folk medicines and in a few traditional dishes. In earlier times, it was much more widely used in breads, porridges, soups, etc. It forms a nutritious and easily digested amylaceous food, being used in place of starch in some preparations of hot chocolate. Cetraric acid or cetrarin, a white micro-crystalline powder with a bitter taste, is readily soluble in alcohol, and slightly soluble in water and ether. It has been recommended for medicinal use by alternative medicine sites, in doses of 2 to 4 grains (0.1 to 0.25 grams), as a bitter tonic and aperient. It is traditionally used to relieve chest ailments, irritation of the oral and pharyngeal mucous membranes and to suppress dry cough.

== Gallery ==
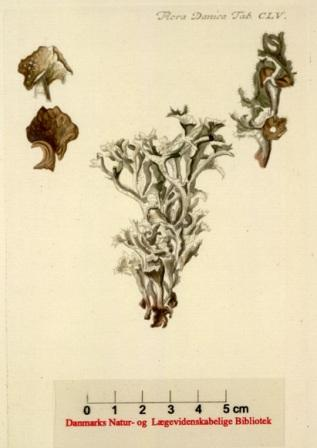
Engraving from the 18th-century botanical work Flora Danica

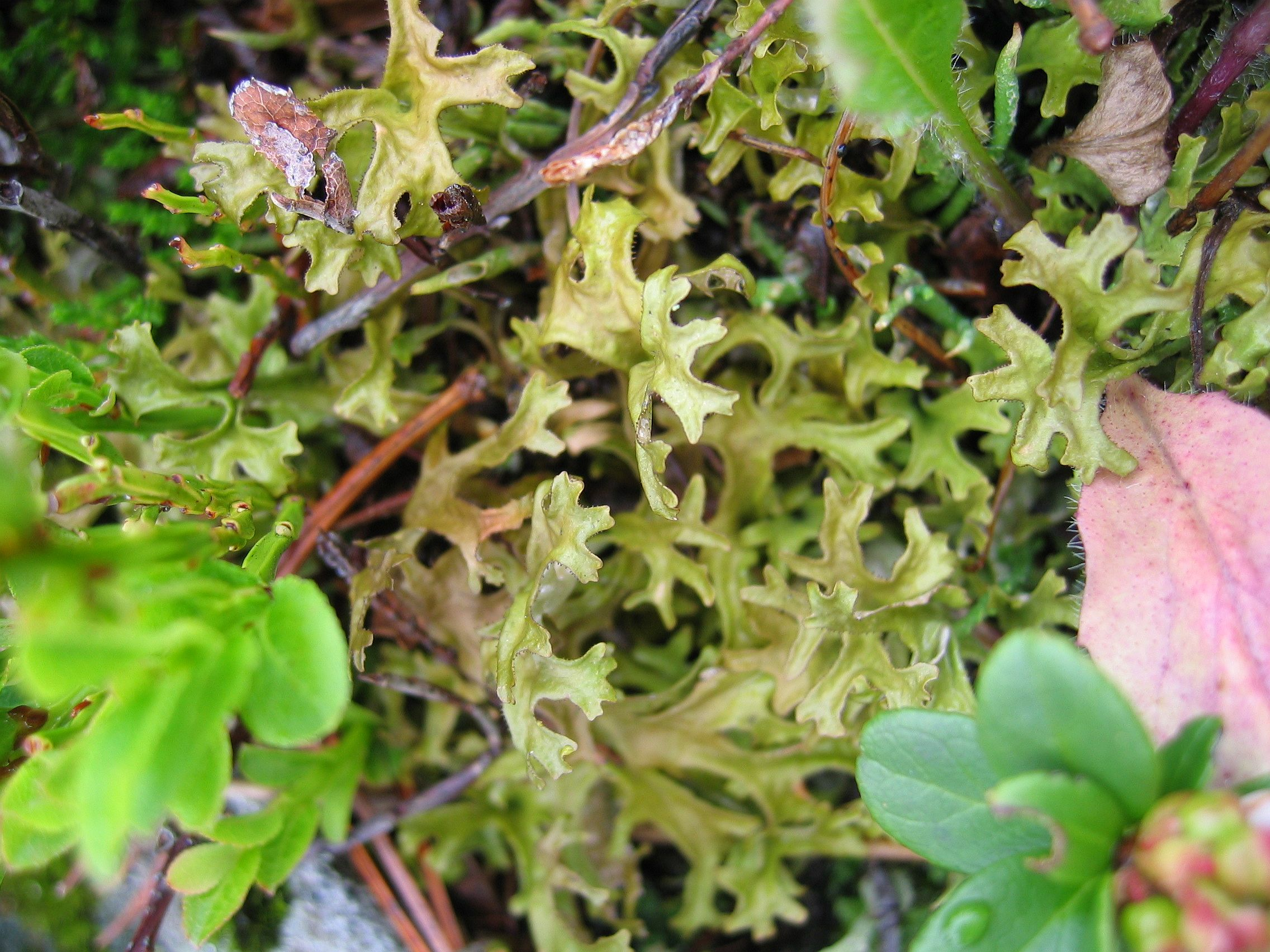
Specimen in Austria

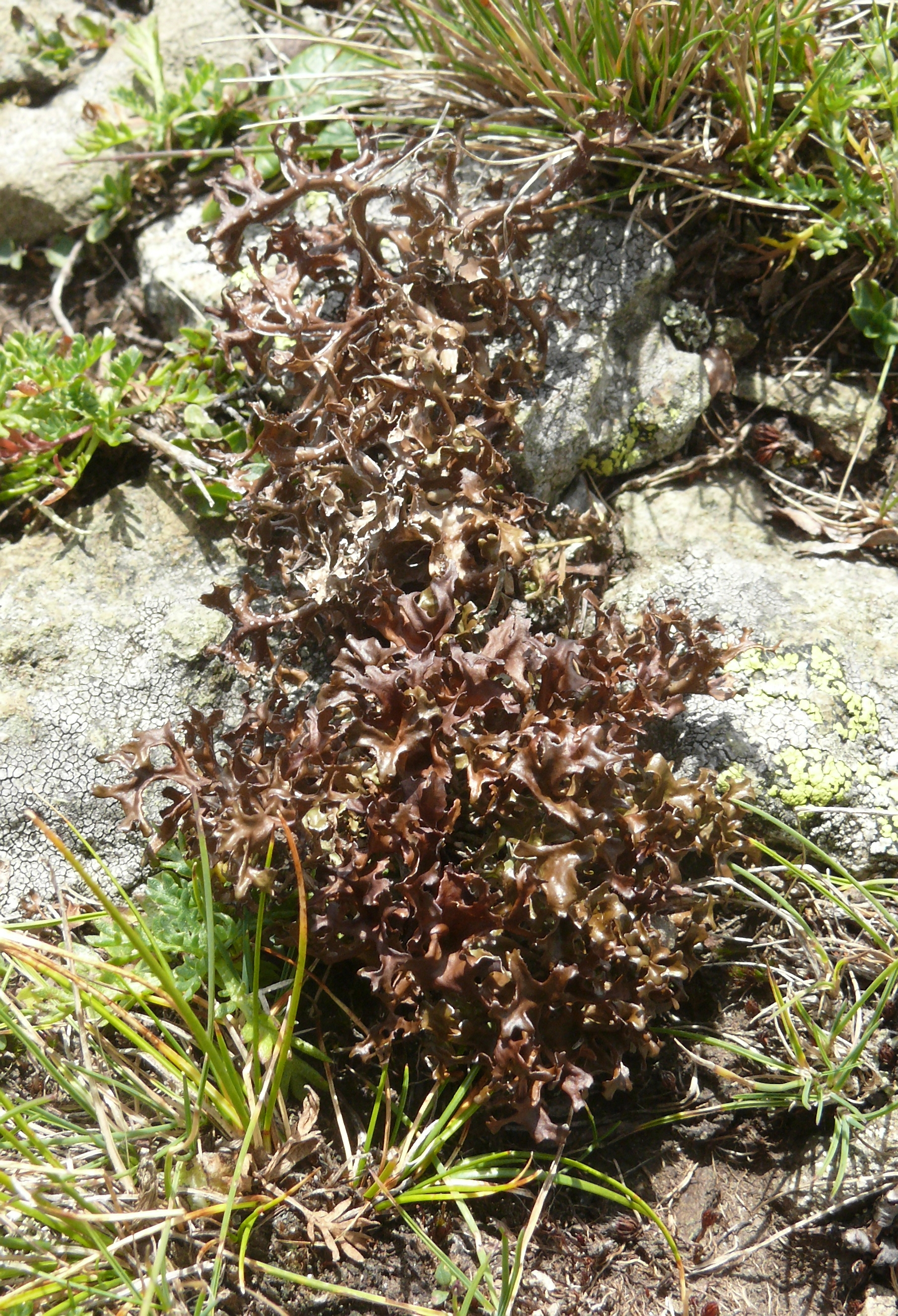
Sarntaler Alpen, Italy

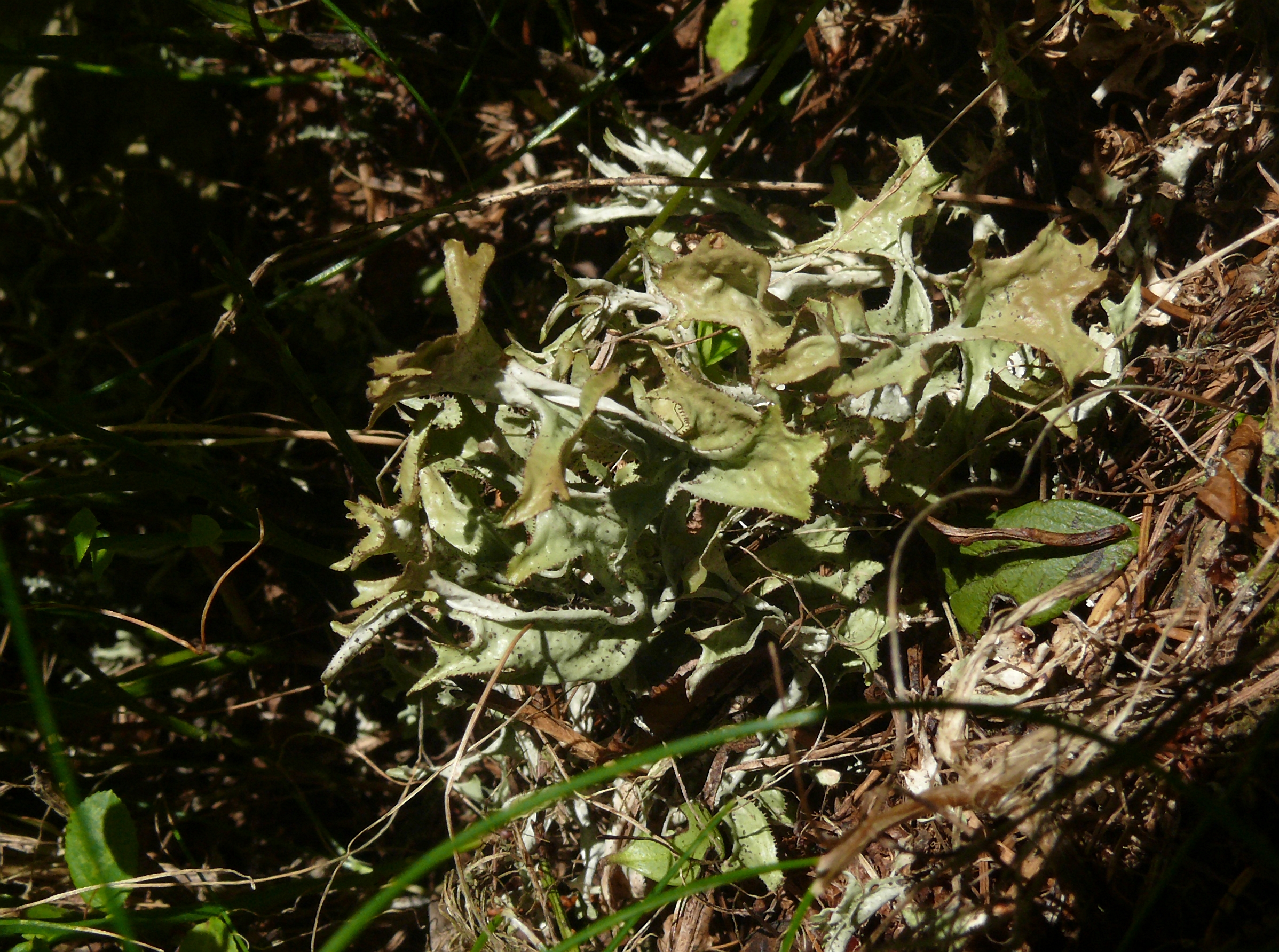
Zillertaler Alpen, Italy

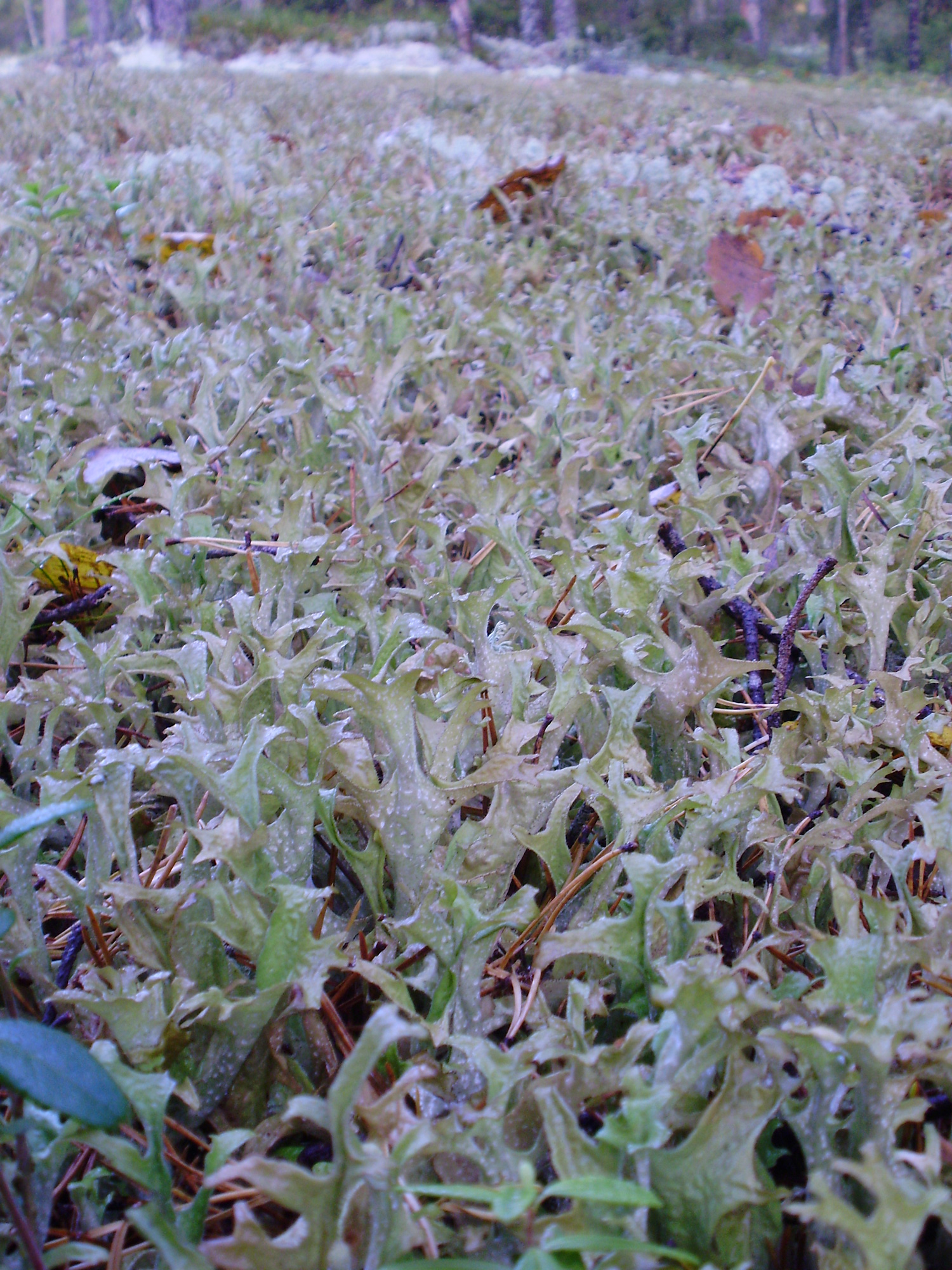
Growing in a mat, Uppland, Sweden

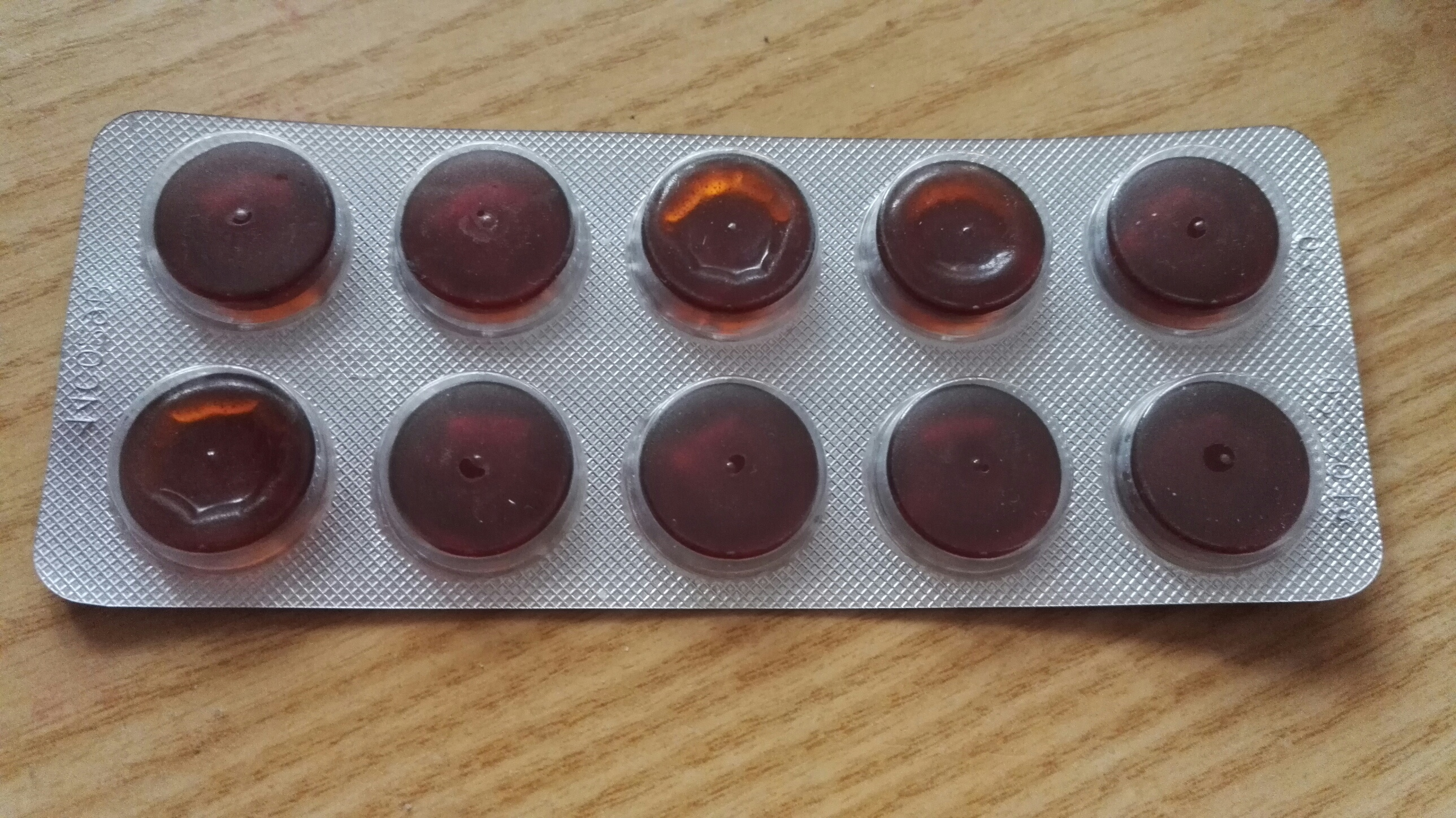
Tablets containing C. islandica used as a dry cough remedy

== See also ==
- List of lichens named by Carl Linnaeus
