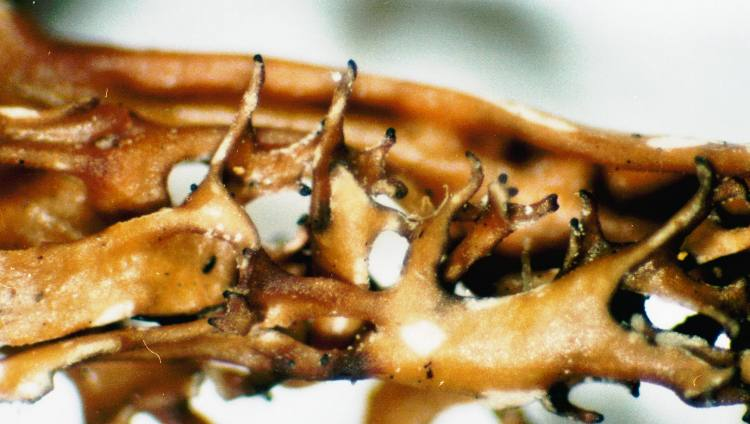
- Cetrariella delisei

Scientific classification
- Kingdom: Fungi
- Division: Ascomycota
- Class: Lecanoromycetes
- Order: Lecanorales
- Family: Parmeliaceae
- Genus: Cetrariella; Kärnefelt & A.Thell (1993)

Type species
- Cetrariella delisei (Bory ex Schaer.) Kärnefelt & A.Thell (1993)

Species
- C. delisei C. fastigiata C. sorediella

= Cetrariella =

Genus of lichen

Cetrariella is a genus of foliose lichens in the family Parmeliaceae. It contains three species.

== Taxonomy ==
The genus was circumscribed in 1993 by lichenologists Ingvar Kärnefelt and Arne Thell, with Cetrariella delisei assigned as the type species. Cetrariella was created as a segregate of genus Cetraria, since previous studies on ascus structure demonstrated that some species placed in Cetraria did not belong there.

In 2017, Divakar and colleagues used a recently developed "temporal phylogenetic" approach to identify temporal bands for specific taxonomic ranks in the family Parmeliaceae, suggesting that groups of species that diverged within the time window of 29.45–32.55 million years ago represent genera. They proposed to synonymize Cetrariella with Cetraria, along with several other Parmelioid genera, so that all the genera within the Parmeliaceae are about the same age. Although some of their proposed taxonomic changes were accepted, the synonymization of Cetrariella with Cetraria was not accepted in a later critical analysis of the temporal banding technique for lichen classification.

== Description ==
Cetrariella species grow on the ground (terricolous) and on rocks (saxicolous). They have an upper and lower cortex, both of which are single-layered and measure 15–40 μm. Their ascus is broadly club-shaped (clavate), with dimensions of about 40 by 15 μm, while the ascospores are ellipsoidal, measuring 5–10 by 2.5–5 μm. Secondary compounds present include gyrophoric acid and hiascic acid.

== Species ==
- Cetrariella delisei (Bory ex Schaer.) Kärnefelt & A.Thell 1993)
- Cetrariella fastigiata (Delise ex Nyl.) Kärnefelt & A.Thell 1993)
- Cetrariella sorediella (Lettau) V.J.Rico & A.Thell (2011)

Cetrariella commixta, a lichen transferred to Cetrariella in 2004, is now a member of Melanelia.
