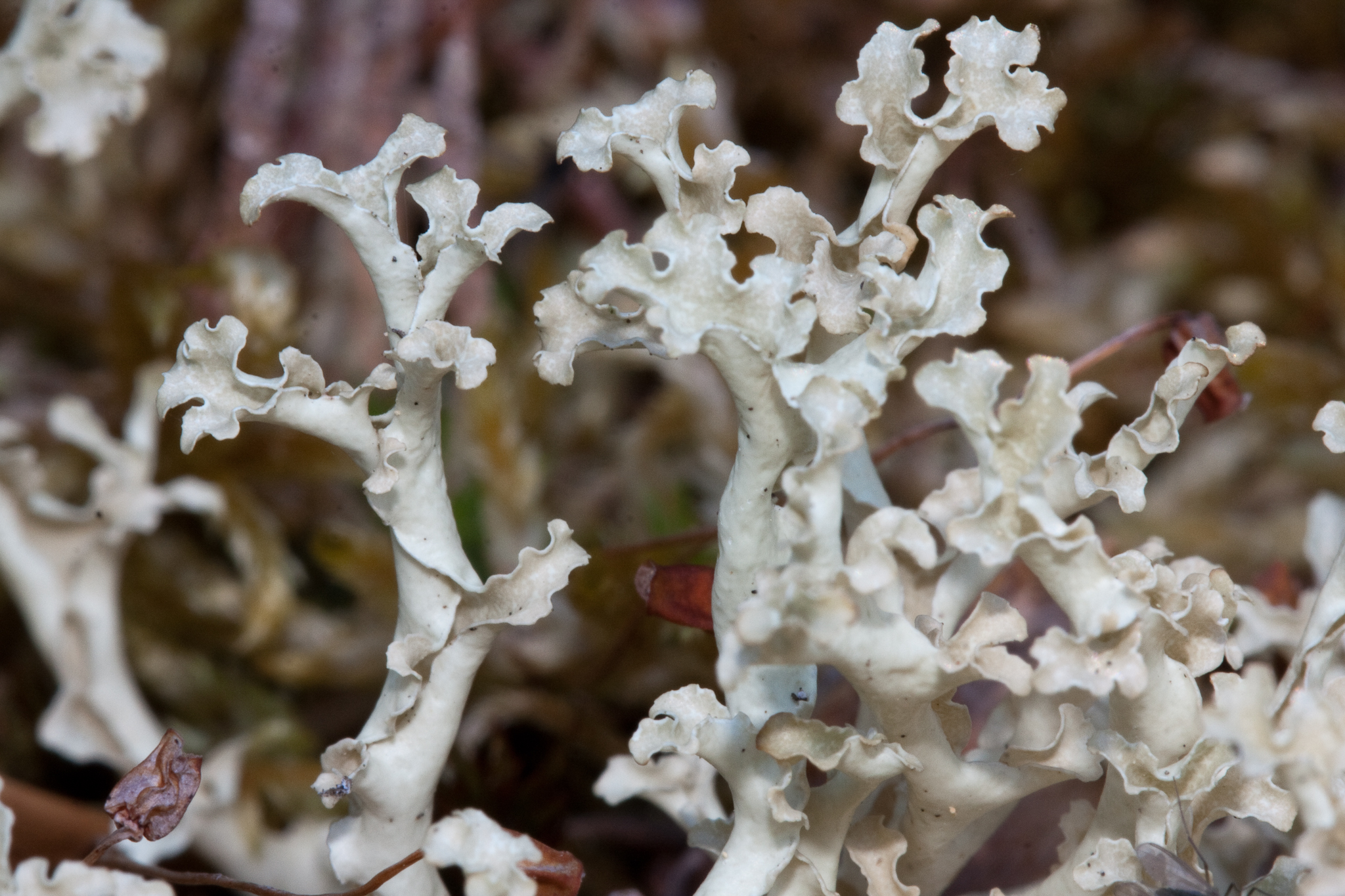
- Flavocetraria cucullata

Scientific classification
- Domain: Eukaryota
- Kingdom: Fungi
- Division: Ascomycota
- Class: Lecanoromycetes
- Order: Lecanorales
- Family: Parmeliaceae
- Genus: Flavocetraria; Kärnefelt & A.Thell (1994)

Type species
- Flavocetraria cucullata (Bellardi) Kärnefelt & A.Thell (1994)

Species
- F. cucullata F. nivalis

= Flavocetraria =

Genus of lichens

Flavocetraria is a genus of lichenized ascomycete fungi in the family Parmeliaceae. The genus contains two species found in arctic-alpine and boreal regions, Flavocetraria cucullata and F. nivalis (syn. Cetraria nivalis).
