= Philipp Maximilian Opiz =

Czech-German forester and botanist

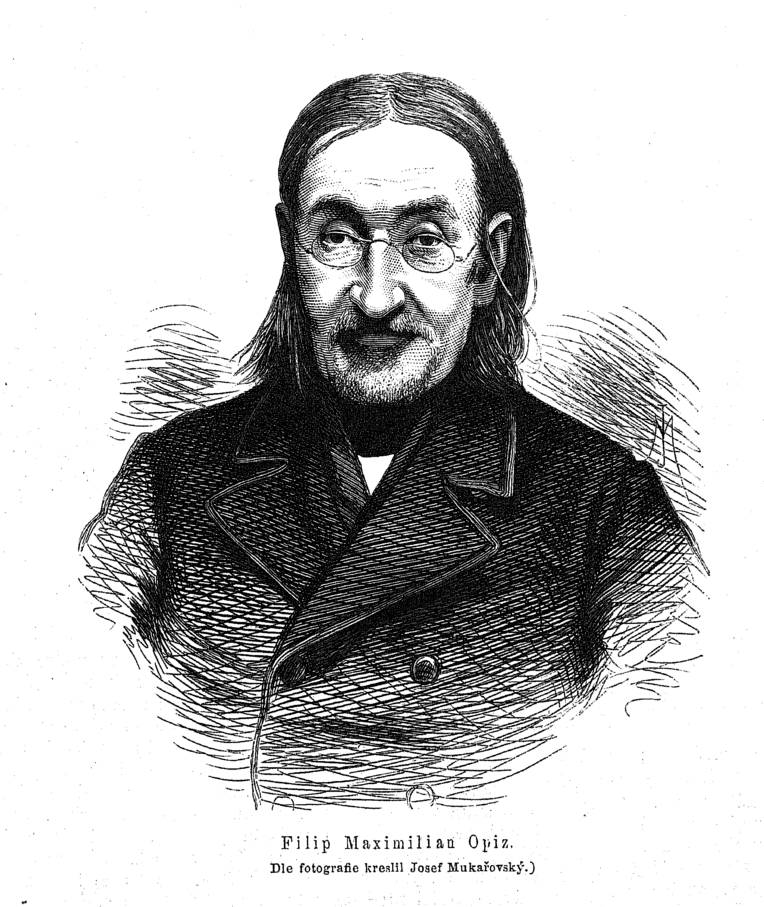
Filip Maximilian Opiz; portrait by Josef Mukařovský

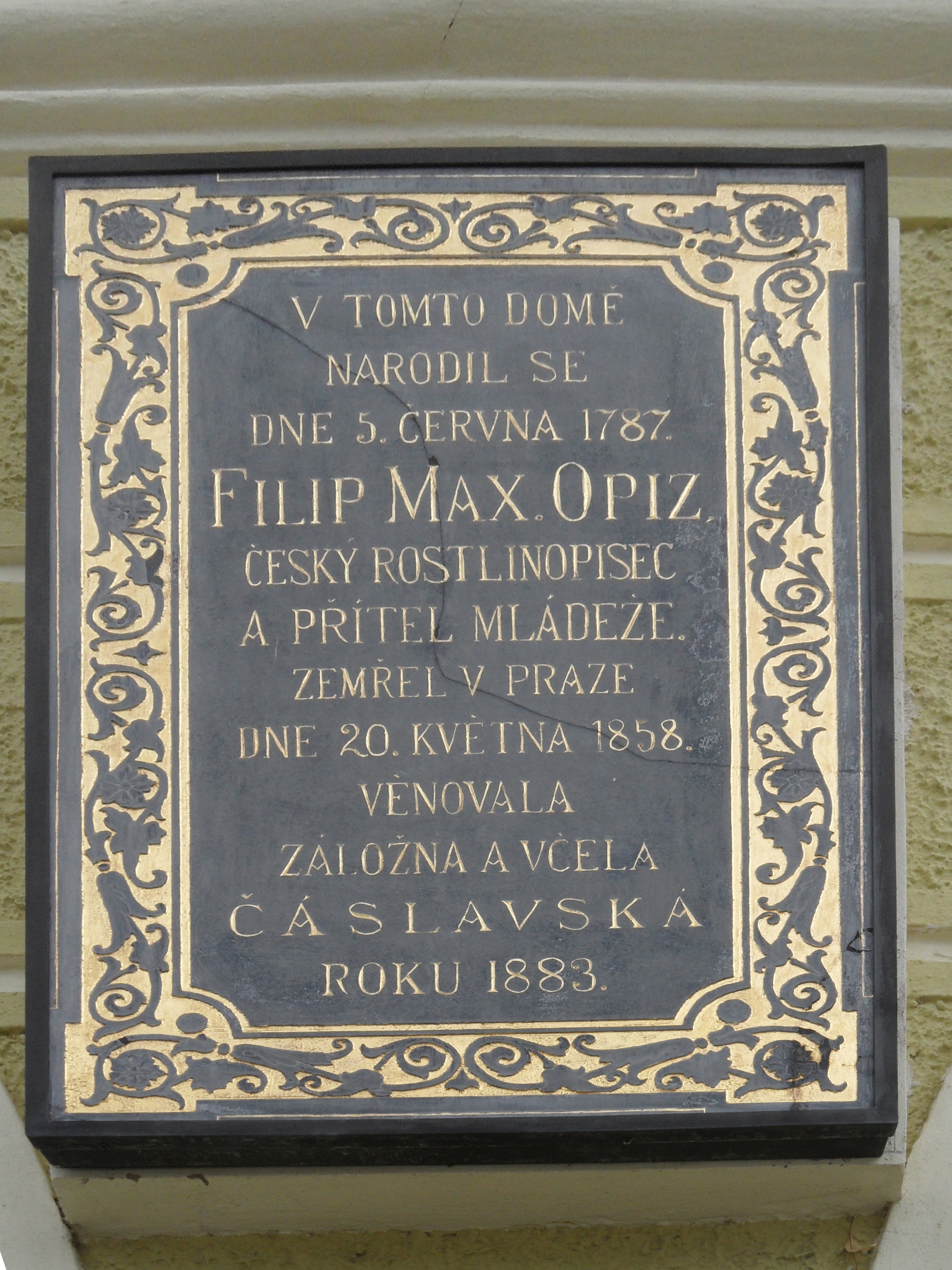
Memorial plaque in Čáslav, his birthplace

Philipp (Filip) Maximilian Opiz (5 June 1787 in Čáslav – 20 May 1858 in Prague) was a forester and botanist in the Austrian Empire of German ethnicity. He made contributions to European botany during the early 19th century. Showing an early interest in botany from childhood, he produced floristic writings and established connections with prominent botanists while working as a government official in various Bohemian towns. Opiz founded the influential "Pflanzentauschanstalt" (plant exchange institution) in Prague in 1819, established a cryptogamic herbarium, edited the botanical journal "Naturalientausch" (1826–1828), and created numerous sets of exsiccatae (dried herbarium specimens) for distribution.

== Biography ==
From childhood, Opiz showed an interest in botany, initially guided by physician A. Steinerer, which led to his early floristic writings, including the Calendarium Florae (1800) and the floristic monograph Flora Czaslaviensis. Between 1804 and 1806, he established connections with notable botanists in Prague and conducted botanical excursions across central and northern Bohemia. Beginning in 1805 he served as a cameral-beamter in his hometown of Čáslav, later working in Pardubice (from 1808) and Prague (from 1814). After serving as an official at the Čáslav pension office, later transferring to Pardubice (1808) and Prague (1814), Opiz significantly promoted the study of lichens, with this period later termed the "Opiz era".

In 1818, Opiz established a herbarium called Flora cryptogamica Boëmiae, notable for its extensive collection of lichens. He founded the Pflanzentauschanstalt in Prague in 1819, a pioneering plant-exchange institution influential across Europe. Additionally, he edited the botanical journal Naturalientausch (1826–1828), contributed to botanical literature, and became a respected member of multiple European botanical societies. He also created many sets of exsiccatae (dried herbarium specimens for distribution). In 1831 he became a Forstamtsconcipist (forestry official).

Several species described by Opiz, including lichens such as Cetraria ericetorum, Cladonia stellaris, and Toninia physaroides, remain accepted today. In 1830 Carl Borivoj Presl named the genus Opizia in his honour.

== Selected publications ==
- Deutschlands cryptogamische Gewächse. Ein Anhang zur Flora Deutschlands von Joh. Christ. Röhling, 1817 - German cryptogams; Notes in regards to "Flora Deutschland" by Johann Christoph Röhling.
- Böheims phänerogamische und cryptogamische gewächse, 1823 - Bohemian phanerogams and cryptogams.
- Seznam rostlin květeny české, 1852, Inventory of Czech flora.
