= List of Bruniales of South Africa =

Flowering plants in the order Bruniales recorded from South Africa

Bruniales is a valid botanic name at the rank of order in the flowering plants. Until recently it was not in use, but a 2008 study suggested that Bruniaceae and Columelliaceae are sister clades. The APG III revision of the APG system, places both families as the only members of the order Bruniales, which is sister to the Apiales, and one of the asterid taxa.

The anthophytes are a grouping of plant taxa bearing flower-like reproductive structures. They were formerly thought to be a clade comprising plants bearing flower-like structures. The group contained the angiosperms - the extant flowering plants, such as roses and grasses - as well as the Gnetales and the extinct Bennettitales.

23,420 species of vascular plant have been recorded in South Africa, making it the sixth most species-rich country in the world and the most species-rich country on the African continent. Of these, 153 species are considered to be threatened. Nine biomes have been described in South Africa: Fynbos, Succulent Karoo, desert, Nama Karoo, grassland, savanna, Albany thickets, the Indian Ocean coastal belt, and forests.

The 2018 South African National Biodiversity Institute's National Biodiversity Assessment plant checklist lists 35,130 taxa in the phyla Anthocerotophyta (hornworts (6)), Anthophyta (flowering plants (33534)), Bryophyta (mosses (685)), Cycadophyta (cycads (42)), Lycopodiophyta (Lycophytes(45)), Marchantiophyta (liverworts (376)), Pinophyta (conifers (33)), and Pteridophyta (cryptogams (408)).

One family is represented in the literature. Listed taxa include species, subspecies, varieties, and forms as recorded, some of which have subsequently been allocated to other taxa as synonyms, in which cases the accepted taxon is appended to the listing. Multiple entries under alternative names reflect taxonomic revision over time.

== Bruniaceae ==
Family: Bruniaceae,

=== Audouinia ===
Genus Audouinia:

- Audouinia capitata (L.) Brongn. endemic
- Audouinia esterhuyseniae (Powrie) A.V.Hall, endemic
- Audouinia hispida (Pillans) Class.-Bockh. & E.G.H.Oliv. endemic
- Audouinia laevis (Pillans) A.V.Hall, endemic
- Audouinia laxa (Thunb.) A.V.Hall, endemic

=== Berardia ===
Genus Berardia:

- Berardia angulata E.Mey. ex Sond. accepted as Brunia angulata (E.Mey. ex Sond.) Class.-Bockh. & E.G.H.Oliv. endemic
- Berardia dregeana Sond. accepted as Brunia dregeana (Sond.) Class.-Bockh. & E.G.H.Oliv. endemic
- Berardia laevis E.Mey. ex Sond. accepted as Brunia latebracteata A.V.Hall, endemic
- Berardia sphaerocephala Sond. accepted as Brunia sphaerocephala (Sond.) A.V.Hall, endemic
- Berardia trigyna Schltr. accepted as Brunia trigyna (Schltr.) Class.-Bockh. & E.G.H.Oliv. endemic

=== Berzelia ===
Genus Berzelia:

- Berzelia abrotanoides (L.) Brongn. endemic
- Berzelia albiflora (E.Phillips) Class.-Bockh. & E.G.H.Oliv. endemic
- Berzelia alopecuriodes (Thunb.) Sond. endemic
- Berzelia arachnoidea (J.C.Wendl.) Eckl. & Zeyh. endemic
- Berzelia burchellii Dummer, endemic
- Berzelia callunoides Oliv. accepted as Brunia callunoides (Oliv.) Class.-Bockh. & E.G.H.Oliv. endemic
- Berzelia commutata Sond. endemic
- Berzelia cordifolia Schltdl. endemic
- Berzelia dregeana Colozza, endemic
- Berzelia ecklonii Pillans, endemic
- Berzelia galpinii Pillans, endemic
- Berzelia incurva Pillans, endemic
- Berzelia intermedia (D.Dietr.) Schltdl. endemic
- Berzelia lanuginosa (L.) Brongn. endemic
- Berzelia rubra (Willd.) Schltdl. endemic
- Berzelia squarrosa (Thunb.) Sond. endemic
- Berzelia stokoei (E.Phillips) A.V.Hall, endemic

=== Brunia ===
Genus Brunia:

- Brunia abrotanoides L. accepted as Berzelia abrotanoides (L.) Brongn. endemic
- Brunia africana (Burm.f.) Class.-Bockh. & E.G.H.Oliv. endemic
- Brunia albiflora E.Phillips, accepted as Berzelia albiflora (E.Phillips) Class.-Bockh. & E.G.H.Oliv. endemic
- Brunia alopecuroides Thunb. accepted as Berzelia alopecuriodes (Thunb.) Sond. endemic
- Brunia angulata (E.Mey. ex Sond.) Class.-Bockh. & E.G.H.Oliv. endemic
- Brunia arachnoidea J.C.Wendl. accepted as Berzelia arachnoidea (J.C.Wendl.) Eckl. & Zeyh. endemic
- Brunia barnardii (Pillans) Class.-Bockh. & E.G.H.Oliv. endemic
- Brunia bullata (Schltr.) Class.-Bockh. & E.G.H.Oliv. endemic
- Brunia callunoides (Oliv.) Class.-Bockh. & E.G.H.Oliv. endemic
- Brunia capitella Thunb. accepted as Staavia capitella (Thunb.) Sond. endemic
- Brunia comosa Thunb. accepted as Berzelia lanuginosa (L.) Brongn. indigenous
- Brunia compacta A.V.Hall, endemic
- Brunia cordata (Burm.f.) Class.-Bockh. & E.G.H.Oliv. endemic
- Brunia dregeana (Sond.) Class.-Bockh. & E.G.H.Oliv. endemic
- Brunia esterhuyseniae (Dummer) Class.-Bockh. & E.G.H.Oliv. endemic
- Brunia fragarioides Willd. endemic
- Brunia glutinosa P.J.Bergius, accepted as Staavia glutinosa (L.) Dahl, endemic
- Brunia laevis Thunb. endemic
- Brunia lanuginosa L. accepted as Berzelia lanuginosa (L.) Brongn. indigenous
- Brunia latebracteata A.V.Hall, endemic
- Brunia laxa Thunb. accepted as Audouinia laxa (Thunb.) A.V.Hall, endemic
- Brunia macrocephala Willd. endemic
- Brunia microphylla Thunb. endemic
- Brunia monogyna (Vahl) Class.-Bockh. & E.G.H.Oliv. endemic
- Brunia monostyla (Pillans) Class.-Bockh. & E.G.H.Oliv. endemic
- Brunia myrtoides (Vahl) Class.-Bockh. & E.G.H.Oliv. endemic
- Brunia neglecta Schltr. endemic
- Brunia nodiflora L. accepted as Brunia noduliflora Goldblatt & J.C.Manning, indigenous
- Brunia noduliflora Goldblatt & J.C.Manning, endemic
- Brunia oblongifolia (Pillans) Class.-Bockh. & E.G.H.Oliv. endemic
- Brunia paleacea P.J.Bergius, endemic
- Brunia palustris (Schltr. ex Dummer) Class.-Bockh. & E.G.H.Oliv. endemic
- Brunia pentandra (Thunb.) Class.-Bockh. & E.G.H.Oliv. endemic
- Brunia phylicoides E.Mey. ex Harv. & Sond. accepted as Brunia dregeana (Sond.) Class.-Bockh. & E.G.H.Oliv. present
- Brunia phylicoides Thunb. endemic
- Brunia pillansii Class.-Bockh. & E.G.H.Oliv. endemic
- Brunia powrieae Class.-Bockh. & E.G.H.Oliv. endemic
- Brunia purpurea (Pillans) Class.-Bockh. & E.G.H.Oliv. endemic
- Brunia rubra Willd. accepted as Berzelia rubra (Willd.) Schltdl. indigenous
- Brunia sacculata (Bolus ex Pillans) Class.-Bockh. & E.G.H.Oliv. endemic
- Brunia schlechteri (Dummer) Class.-Bockh. & E.G.H.Oliv. endemic
- Brunia sphaerocephala (Sond.) A.V.Hall, endemic
- Brunia squalida E.Mey. ex Sond. endemic
- Brunia squarrosa Thunb. accepted as Berzelia squarrosa (Thunb.) Sond. endemic
- Brunia staavioides Sond. accepted as Staavia staavioides (Sond.) A.V.Hall, endemic
- Brunia stokoei E.Phillips, accepted as Berzelia stokoei (E.Phillips) A.V.Hall, endemic
- Brunia teres Oliv. accepted as Thamnea teres (Oliv.) Class.-Bockh. & E.G.H.Oliv. endemic
- Brunia thomae Class.-Bockh. & E.G.H.Oliv. endemic
- Brunia trigyna (Schltr.) Class.-Bockh. & E.G.H.Oliv. endemic
- Brunia tulbaghensis (Schltr. ex Dummer) Class.-Bockh. & E.G.H.Oliv. endemic
- Brunia uniflora L. accepted as Thamnea uniflora Sol. ex Brongn. endemic
- Brunia variabilis (Pillans) Class.-Bockh. & E.G.H.Oliv. endemic
- Brunia verticillata L.f. accepted as Staavia verticillata (L.f.) Pillans, endemic
- Brunia villosa (C.Presl) E.Mey. ex Sond. endemic
- Brunia virgata Brongn. endemic

=== Linconia ===
Genus Linconia:

- Linconia alopecuroidea L. endemic
- Linconia cuspidata (Thunb.) Sw. endemic
- Linconia deusta (Thunb.) Pillans, accepted as Linconia cuspidata (Thunb.) Sw. indigenous
- Linconia ericoides E.G.H.Oliv. endemic

=== Lonchostoma ===
Genus Lonchostoma:

- Lonchostoma esterhuyseniae Strid, accepted as Brunia esterhuyseniae (Dummer) Class.-Bockh. & E.G.H.Oliv. endemic
- Lonchostoma monogynum (Vahl) Pillans, accepted as Brunia monogyna (Vahl) Class.-Bockh. & E.G.H.Oliv. endemic
- Lonchostoma myrtoides (Vahl) Pillans, accepted as Brunia myrtoides (Vahl) Class.-Bockh. & E.G.H.Oliv. endemic
- Lonchostoma obtusiflorum Wikstr. accepted as Brunia pentandra (Thunb.) Class.-Bockh. & E.G.H.Oliv. endemic
- Lonchostoma pentandrum (Thunb.) Druce, accepted as Brunia pentandra (Thunb.) Class.-Bockh. & E.G.H.Oliv. endemic
- Lonchostoma purpureum Pillans, accepted as Brunia purpurea (Pillans) Class.-Bockh. & E.G.H.Oliv. endemic

=== Mniothamnea ===
Genus Mniothamnea:

- Mniothamnea bullata Schltr. accepted as Brunia bullata (Schltr.) Class.-Bockh. & E.G.H.Oliv. endemic
- Mniothamnea callunoides (Oliv.) Nied. accepted as Brunia callunoides (Oliv.) Class.-Bockh. & E.G.H.Oliv. endemic

=== Nebelia ===
Genus Nebelia:

- Nebelia fragarioides (Willd.) Kuntze, accepted as Brunia fragarioides Willd. endemic
- Nebelia laevis (E.Mey.) Kuntze, accepted as Brunia latebracteata A.V.Hall, endemic
- Nebelia paleacea (P.J.Bergius) Sweet, accepted as Brunia paleacea P.J.Bergius, endemic
- Nebelia sphaerocephala (Sond.) Kuntze, accepted as Brunia sphaerocephala (Sond.) A.V.Hall, endemic
- Nebelia stokoei Pillans, accepted as Brunia powrieae Class.-Bockh. & E.G.H.Oliv. endemic
- Nebelia tulbaghensis Schltr. ex Dummer, accepted as Brunia tulbaghensis (Schltr. ex Dummer) Class.-Bockh. & E.G.H.Oliv. endemic

=== Pseudobaeckea ===
Genus Pseudobaeckea:

- Pseudobaeckea africana (Burm.f.) Pillans, accepted as Brunia africana (Burm.f.) Class.-Bockh. & E.G.H.Oliv. endemic
- Pseudobaeckea cordata (Burm.f.) Nied. accepted as Brunia cordata (Burm.f.) Class.-Bockh. & E.G.H.Oliv. endemic
  - Pseudobaeckea cordata (Burm.f.) Nied. var. monostyla Pillans, accepted as Brunia monostyla (Pillans) Class.-Bockh. & E.G.H.Oliv. indigenous
- Pseudobaeckea palustris Schltr. ex Dummer, accepted as Brunia palustris (Schltr. ex Dummer) Class.-Bockh. & E.G.H.Oliv. endemic
- Pseudobaeckea stokoei Pillans, accepted as Brunia pillansii Class.-Bockh. & E.G.H.Oliv. endemic
- Pseudobaeckea teres (Oliv.) Dummer, accepted as Thamnea teres (Oliv.) Class.-Bockh. & E.G.H.Oliv. endemic

=== Ptyxostoma ===
Genus Ptyxostoma:

- Ptyxostoma monogyna Vahl, accepted as Brunia monogyna (Vahl) Class.-Bockh. & E.G.H.Oliv. endemic
- Ptyxostoma myrtoides Vahl, accepted as Brunia myrtoides (Vahl) Class.-Bockh. & E.G.H.Oliv. endemic

=== Raspalia ===
Genus Raspalia:

- Raspalia angulata (E.Mey. ex Sond.) Nied. accepted as Brunia angulata (E.Mey. ex Sond.) Class.-Bockh. & E.G.H.Oliv. endemic
- Raspalia barnardii Pillans, accepted as Brunia barnardii (Pillans) Class.-Bockh. & E.G.H.Oliv. endemic
- Raspalia dregeana (Sond.) Nied. accepted as Brunia dregeana (Sond.) Class.-Bockh. & E.G.H.Oliv. endemic
- Raspalia globosa (Lam.) Pillans, accepted as Brunia squalida E.Mey. ex Sond. endemic
- Raspalia microphylla (Thunb.) Brongn. accepted as Brunia microphylla Thunb. endemic
- Raspalia oblongifolia Pillans, accepted as Brunia oblongifolia (Pillans) Class.-Bockh. & E.G.H.Oliv. endemic
- Raspalia palustris (Schltr. ex Dummer) Pillans, accepted as Brunia palustris (Schltr. ex Dummer) Class.-Bockh. & E.G.H.Oliv. endemic
- Raspalia palustris (Schltr. ex Kirchn.) Pillans, accepted as Brunia palustris (Schltr. ex Dummer) Class.-Bockh. & E.G.H.Oliv. endemic
- Raspalia passerinoides C.Presl, accepted as Brunia phylicoides Thunb. endemic
- Raspalia phylicoides (Thunb.) Arn. accepted as Brunia phylicoides Thunb. endemic
- Raspalia sacculata (Bolus ex Kirchn.) Pillans, accepted as Brunia sacculata (Bolus ex Pillans) Class.-Bockh. & E.G.H.Oliv. endemic
- Raspalia sacculata (Bolus ex Kirchn.) Pillans, accepted as Brunia sacculata (Bolus ex Pillans) Class.-Bockh. & E.G.H.Oliv. endemic
- Raspalia schlechteri Dummer, accepted as Brunia schlechteri (Dummer) Class.-Bockh. & E.G.H.Oliv. endemic
- Raspalia staavioides (Sond.) Pillans, accepted as Staavia staavioides (Sond.) A.V.Hall, endemic
- Raspalia stokoei Pillans, accepted as Brunia thomae Class.-Bockh. & E.G.H.Oliv. endemic
- Raspalia trigyna (Schltr.) Dummer, accepted as Brunia trigyna (Schltr.) Class.-Bockh. & E.G.H.Oliv. endemic
- Raspalia variabilis Pillans, accepted as Brunia variabilis (Pillans) Class.-Bockh. & E.G.H.Oliv. endemic
- Raspalia villosa C.Presl, accepted as Brunia villosa (C.Presl) E.Mey. ex Sond. endemic
- Raspalia virgata (Brongn.) Pillans, accepted as Brunia virgata Brongn. endemic

=== Staavia ===
Genus Staavia:

- Staavia brownii Dummer, endemic
- Staavia capitella (Thunb.) Sond. endemic
- Staavia comosa (Thunb.) Colozza, accepted as Berzelia lanuginosa (L.) Brongn. indigenous
- Staavia dodii Bolus, endemic
- Staavia dregeana C.Presl, accepted as Staavia pinifolia Willd. indigenous
- Staavia glutinosa (L.) Dahl, endemic
- Staavia phylicoides Pillans, endemic
- Staavia pinifolia Willd. endemic
- Staavia radiata (L.) Dahl, endemic
- Staavia staavioides (Sond.) A.V.Hall, endemic
- Staavia trichotoma (Thunb.) Pillans, endemic
- Staavia verticillata (L.f.) Pillans, endemic
- Staavia zeyheri Sond. endemic

=== Thamnea ===
Genus Thamnea:

- Thamnea depressa Oliv. endemic
- Thamnea diosmoides Oliv. accepted as Thamnea unstulata (Thunb.) A.V.Hall, endemic
- Thamnea gracilis (Kuntze) Oliv. endemic
- Thamnea hirtella Oliv. endemic
- Thamnea massoniana Dummer, endemic
- Thamnea matroosbergensis A.V.Hall, endemic
- Thamnea teres (Oliv.) Class.-Bockh. & E.G.H.Oliv. endemic
- Thamnea thesioides Dummer, endemic
- Thamnea uniflora Sol. ex Brongn. endemic
- Thamnea unstulata (Thunb.) A.V.Hall, endemic

=== Tittmannia ===
Genus Tittmannia:

- Tittmannia esterhuyseniae Powrie, accepted as Audouinia esterhuyseniae (Powrie) A.V.Hall, endemic
- Tittmannia hispida Pillans, accepted as Audouinia hispida (Pillans) Class.-Bockh. & E.G.H.Oliv. endemic
- Tittmannia laevis Pillans, accepted as Audouinia laevis (Pillans) A.V.Hall, endemic
- Tittmannia laxa (Thunb.) C.Presl, accepted as Audouinia laxa (Thunb.) A.V.Hall, endemic
  - Tittmannia laxa (Thunb.) C.Presl subsp. oliveri (Dummer) Powrie, accepted as Audouinia laxa (Thunb.) A.V.Hall, endemic
  - Tittmannia laxa (Thunb.) C.Presl var. langebergensis Pillans, accepted as Audouinia laxa (Thunb.) A.V.Hall, endemic
- Tittmannia oliveri Dummer, accepted as Audouinia laxa (Thunb.) A.V.Hall, endemic
- Tittmannia pruinosa Dummer, accepted as Audouinia laxa (Thunb.) A.V.Hall, endemic
