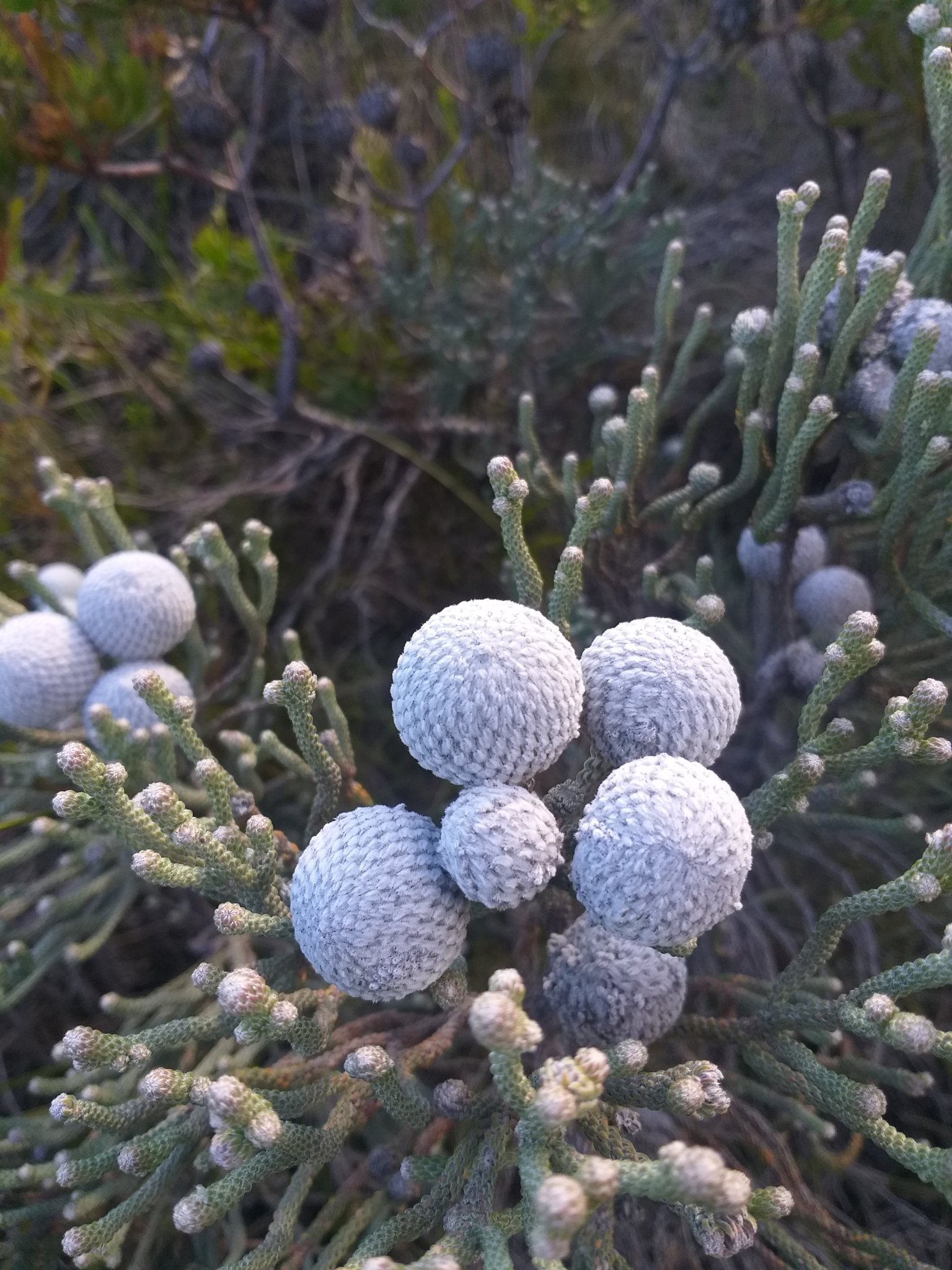

Conservation status
- Near Threatened (IUCN 3.1)

Scientific classification
- Kingdom: Plantae
- Clade: Tracheophytes
- Clade: Angiosperms
- Clade: Eudicots
- Clade: Asterids
- Order: Bruniales
- Family: Bruniaceae
- Genus: Brunia
- Species: B. laevis

Binomial name
- Brunia laevis Thunb., (1794)

Synonyms
- Brunia superba Krauss ex Harv. & Sond.; Heterodon superbus Meisn.

= Brunia laevis =

Species of plant

Brunia laevis, the silver brunia, is a shrub belonging to the genus Brunia. The species is endemic to the Western Cape and is part of the fynbos.
