= Staavia verticillata =

Scientific classification
- Kingdom: Plantae
- Clade: Tracheophytes
- Clade: Angiosperms
- Clade: Eudicots
- Clade: Asterids
- Order: Bruniales
- Family: Bruniaceae
- Genus: Staavia
- Species: S. verticillata

Binomial name
- Staavia verticillata (L.f.) Pillans

Synonyms
- Brunia verticillata L.f.; Staavia nuda Brongn.

Species of plant

Staavia verticillata is a perennial, flowering shrub that is part of the Staavia genus. The species is endemic to the Western Cape and is part of the fynbos. The plant occurs between Bainskloof and Du Toit's Kloof. The plant has a range of 69 km² and there are three subpopulations but is threatened by too many fires and invasive plants.
