= Audouinia laevis =

Scientific classification
- Kingdom: Plantae
- Clade: Tracheophytes
- Clade: Angiosperms
- Clade: Eudicots
- Clade: Asterids
- Order: Bruniales
- Family: Bruniaceae
- Genus: Audouinia
- Species: A. laevis

Binomial name
- Audouinia laevis (Pillans) A.V.Hall

Synonyms
- Tittmannia laevis Pillans

Species of plant

Audouinia laevis is a perennial shrub that is part of the Audouinia genus. The species is endemic to the Western Cape and is part of the fynbos.
