= Brunia latebracteata =

Scientific classification
- Kingdom: Plantae
- Clade: Tracheophytes
- Clade: Angiosperms
- Clade: Eudicots
- Clade: Asterids
- Order: Bruniales
- Family: Bruniaceae
- Genus: Brunia
- Species: B. latebracteata

Binomial name
- Brunia latebracteata A.V.Hall

Synonyms
- Berardia laevis E.Mey. ex Sond.; Nebelia laevis (E.Mey. ex Sond.) Kuntze

Species of flowering plant

Brunia latebracteata is a shrub belonging to the genus Brunia. The species is endemic to the Western Cape and is part of the fynbos. The plant occurs in the Riviersonderend Mountains on the higher mountain slopes. It has an area of occurrence of less than 10 square kilometres (3.9 square miles) and there are two subpopulations. The plant is threatened by the invasive plant Pinus as well as too many fires.
