= Brunia barnardii =

Scientific classification
- Kingdom: Plantae
- Clade: Tracheophytes
- Clade: Angiosperms
- Clade: Eudicots
- Clade: Asterids
- Order: Bruniales
- Family: Bruniaceae
- Genus: Brunia
- Species: B. barnardii

Binomial name
- Brunia barnardii (Pillans) Class.-Bockh. & E.G.H.Oliv.

Synonyms
- Raspalia barnardii Pillans

Species of flowering plant

Brunia barnardii is a shrub belonging to the genus Brunia. The species is endemic to the Western Cape and is part of the fynbos.It occurs in the Langeberg at Goedgeloof Peak. There are fewer than 250 plants in the population.
