= Brunia schlechteri =

Scientific classification
- Kingdom: Plantae
- Clade: Tracheophytes
- Clade: Angiosperms
- Clade: Eudicots
- Clade: Asterids
- Order: Bruniales
- Family: Bruniaceae
- Genus: Brunia
- Species: B. schlechteri

Binomial name
- Brunia schlechteri (Dümmer) Class.-Bockh. & E.G.H.Oliv.

Synonyms
- Raspalia schlechteri Dümmer

Species of plant

Brunia schlechteri is a shrub belonging to the genus Brunia. The species is endemic to the Western Cape and is part of the fynbos. It occurs in the Langeberg and has a range of less than 500 km². There are only two subpopulations and the plant is considered rare.
