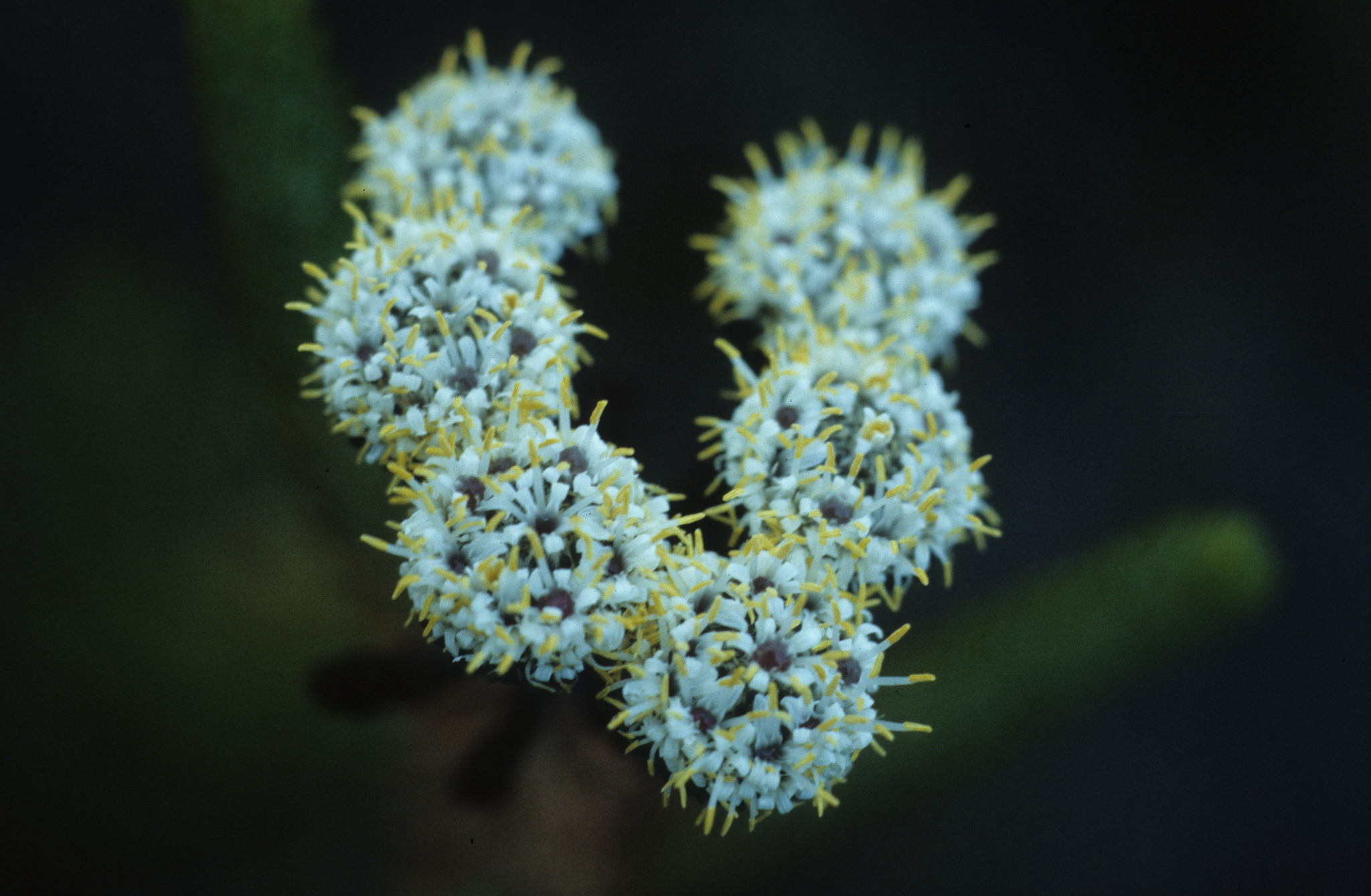

Scientific classification
- Kingdom: Plantae
- Clade: Tracheophytes
- Clade: Angiosperms
- Clade: Eudicots
- Clade: Asterids
- Order: Bruniales
- Family: Bruniaceae
- Genus: Berzelia
- Species: B. albiflora

Binomial name
- Berzelia albiflora (E.Phillips) Class.-Bockh. & E.G.H.Oliv., (2011)

Synonyms
- Berzelia rogersii N.E.Br.; Brunia albiflora E.Phillips

= Berzelia albiflora =

Species of flowering plant

Berzelia albiflora is a shrub that belongs to the family Bruniaceae. The species is endemic to the Western Cape and is part of the fynbos. The plant's FSA number is 141.3
