= Berzelia incurva =

Scientific classification
- Kingdom: Plantae
- Clade: Tracheophytes
- Clade: Angiosperms
- Clade: Eudicots
- Clade: Asterids
- Order: Bruniales
- Family: Bruniaceae
- Genus: Berzelia
- Species: B. incurva

Binomial name
- Berzelia incurva Pillans, (1947)

Species of flowering plant

Berzelia incurva is a shrub that belongs to the Bruniaceae family. The species is endemic to the Western Cape and is part of the fynbos. The plant occurs from Babylonstoren to Stanford. It has an area of occurrence of 80 km² and there are less than nine subpopulations. The plant is considered rare.
