= Thamnea teres =

Scientific classification
- Kingdom: Plantae
- Clade: Tracheophytes
- Clade: Angiosperms
- Clade: Eudicots
- Clade: Asterids
- Order: Bruniales
- Family: Bruniaceae
- Genus: Thamnea
- Species: T. teres

Binomial name
- Thamnea teres (Oliv.) Class.-Bockh. & E.G.H.Oliv.

Synonyms
- Brunia teres Oliv.; Pseudobaeckea teres (Oliv.) Dümmer

Species of flowering plant

Thamnea teres is a perennial, flowering shrub that is part of the Bruniaceae family. The species is endemic to the Western Cape.
