= Brunia africana =

Scientific classification
- Kingdom: Plantae
- Clade: Tracheophytes
- Clade: Angiosperms
- Clade: Eudicots
- Clade: Asterids
- Order: Bruniales
- Family: Bruniaceae
- Genus: Brunia
- Species: B. africana

Binomial name
- Brunia africana (Burm.f.) Class.-Bockh. & E.G.H.Oliv.

Synonyms
- Baeckea africana Burm.f.; Baeckea thyrsiflora Harv. & Sond.; Baeckea thyrsophara Eckl. & Zeyh.; Brunia pinifolia Brongn.; Brunia thyrsophora Walp.; Linconia tamariscina E.Mey.; Pseudobaeckea africana (Burm.f.) Pillans; Pseudobaeckea pinifolia (Brongn.) Nied.; Phylica pinifolia L.f.; Phylica thyrsophora Steud.

Species of plant

Brunia africana is a shrub belonging to the genus Brunia. The species is endemic to the Western Cape and is part of the fynbos.
