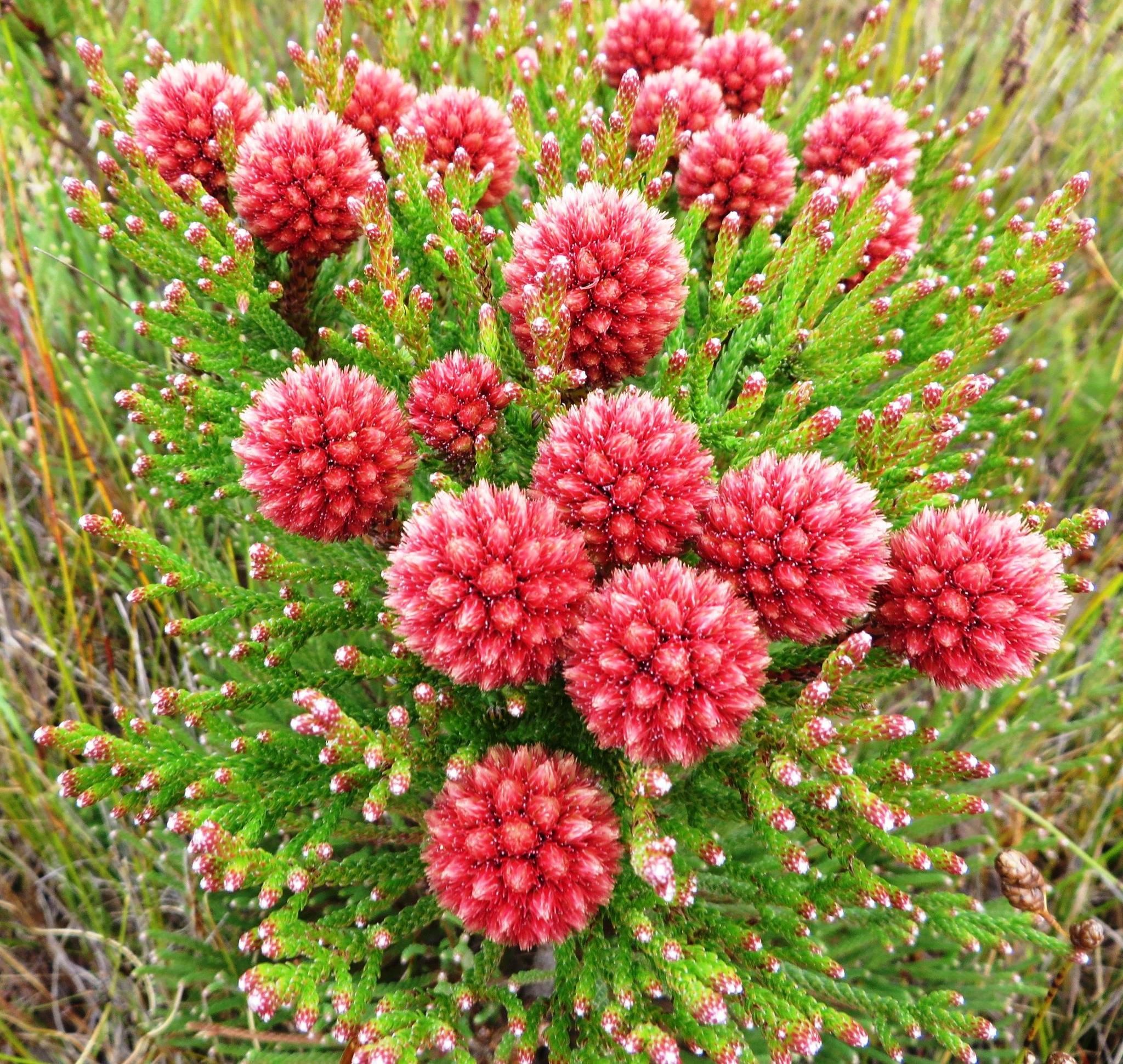

Scientific classification
- Kingdom: Plantae
- Clade: Tracheophytes
- Clade: Angiosperms
- Clade: Eudicots
- Clade: Asterids
- Order: Bruniales
- Family: Bruniaceae
- Genus: Brunia
- Species: B. fragarioides

Binomial name
- Brunia fragarioides Willd.

Synonyms
- List: Berardia affinis Brongn.; Berardia affinis Sond.; Berardia fragarioides (Willd.) Schltdl.; Berardia globosa Sond.; Berzelia globosa G.Don; Brunia globosa (Sond.) Thunb.; Heterodon fragarioides (Willd.) Meisn.; Linconia capitata Banks ex Brongn.; Nebelia affinis (Brongn.) Sweet; Nebelia fragarioides (Willd.) Kuntze; Nebelia globosa (Sond.) Dümmer; Nebelia sonderiana Kuntze

= Brunia fragarioides =

Species of flowering plant

Brunia fragarioides is a shrub belonging to the genus Brunia. The species is endemic to the Western Cape and is part of the fynbos.
