= Brunia myrtoides =

Scientific classification
- Kingdom: Plantae
- Clade: Tracheophytes
- Clade: Angiosperms
- Clade: Eudicots
- Clade: Asterids
- Order: Bruniales
- Family: Bruniaceae
- Genus: Brunia
- Species: B. myrtoides

Binomial name
- Brunia myrtoides (Vahl) Class.-Bockh. & E.G.H.Oliv.

Synonyms
- Lonchostoma aculiflorum Wikstr.; Lonchostoma myrtoides (Vahl) Pillans; Ptyxostoma acutiflorum (Wikstr.) Druce; Ptyxostoma myrtoides Vahl

Species of plant

Brunia myrtoides is a shrub belonging to the genus Brunia. The species is endemic to the Western Cape, occurring at Ceres and is part of the fynbos. There are four subpopulations and the total number of plants is less than one thousand. The plant has lost 30% of its habitat to the cultivation of deciduous fruits, and it has already destroyed two subpopulations.
