= Thamnea uniflora =

Scientific classification
- Kingdom: Plantae
- Clade: Tracheophytes
- Clade: Angiosperms
- Clade: Eudicots
- Clade: Asterids
- Order: Bruniales
- Family: Bruniaceae
- Genus: Thamnea
- Species: T. uniflora

Binomial name
- Thamnea uniflora (L.) Sol. ex Brongn.

Synonyms
- Brunia uniflora L.; Diosma uniflora (L.) Druce; Schinzafra uniflora (Sol. ex Brongn.) Kuntze

Species of flowering plant

Thamnea uniflora is a perennial, flowering shrub that is part of the Bruniaceae family. The species is endemic to the Western Cape.
