= Brunia monostyla =

Scientific classification
- Kingdom: Plantae
- Clade: Tracheophytes
- Clade: Angiosperms
- Clade: Eudicots
- Clade: Asterids
- Order: Bruniales
- Family: Bruniaceae
- Genus: Brunia
- Species: B. monostyla

Binomial name
- Brunia monostyla (Pillans) Class.-Bockh. & E.G.H.Oliv., (2011)

Synonyms
- Pseudobaeckea cordata var. monostyla Pillans

Species of plant

Brunia monostyla is a shrub belonging to the genus Brunia. The species is endemic to the Western Cape and is part of the fynbos. The plant occurs in the mountains of the Western Cape, from the Olifants River valley to Ceres and the mountains around Worcester. The plant is considered rare.
