= Brunia bullata =

Scientific classification
- Kingdom: Plantae
- Clade: Tracheophytes
- Clade: Angiosperms
- Clade: Eudicots
- Clade: Asterids
- Order: Bruniales
- Family: Bruniaceae
- Genus: Brunia
- Species: B. bullata

Binomial name
- Brunia bullata (Schltr.) Class.-Bockh. & E.G.H.Oliv.

Synonyms
- Mniothamnea bullata Schltr.

Species of flowering plant

Brunia bullata is a shrub belonging to the genus Brunia. The species is endemic to the Western Cape and is part of the fynbos. It occurs in the Langeberg, from Suurbraak to Lemoenshoek Peak. There are three subpopulations on three peaks of less than ten plants each. The plant is threatened by excessive fires.
