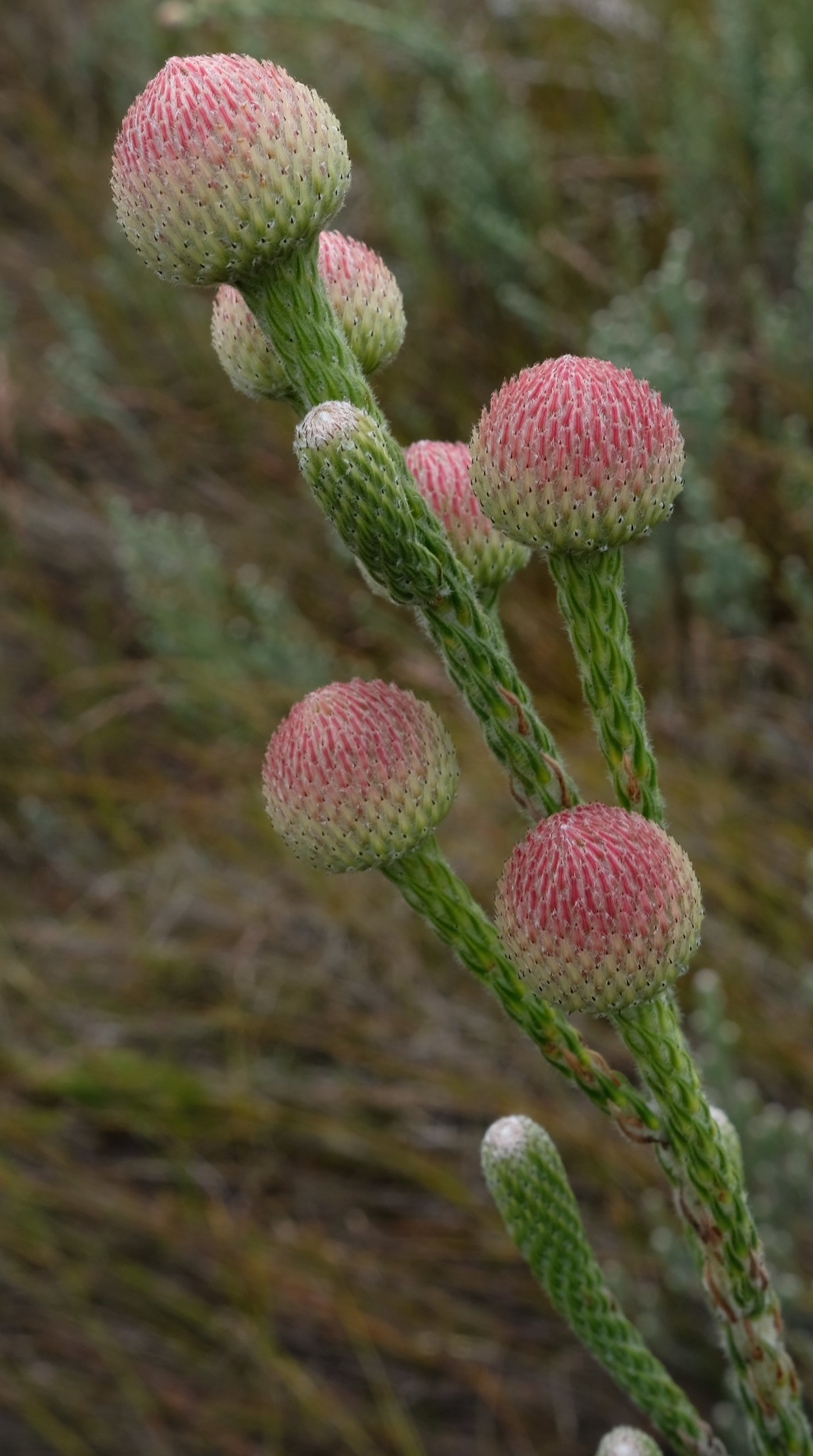

Scientific classification
- Kingdom: Plantae
- Clade: Tracheophytes
- Clade: Angiosperms
- Clade: Eudicots
- Clade: Asterids
- Order: Bruniales
- Family: Bruniaceae
- Genus: Brunia
- Species: B. sphaerocephala

Binomial name
- Brunia sphaerocephala (Sond.) A.V.Hall

Synonyms
- Berardia sphaerocephala Sond.; Brunia microcephala E.Mey. ex Harv. & Sond.; Nebelia sphaerocephala (Sond.) Kuntze

= Brunia sphaerocephala =

Species of plant

Brunia sphaerocephala, the ball spikekol, is a shrub belonging to the genus Brunia. The species is endemic to the Western Cape and is part of the fynbos. The plant occurs in the Slanghoek, Wemmershoek and Hottentots Holland Mountains. There are four to five subpopulations and the plant is threatened by invasive species.
