= Brunia monogyna =

Scientific classification
- Kingdom: Plantae
- Clade: Tracheophytes
- Clade: Angiosperms
- Clade: Eudicots
- Clade: Asterids
- Order: Bruniales
- Family: Bruniaceae
- Genus: Brunia
- Species: B. monogyna

Binomial name
- Brunia monogyna (Vahl) Class.-Bockh. & E.G.H.Oliv., (2011)

Synonyms
- Gravenhorstia fastigiata Nees; Lonchostoma monogynum (Vahl) Pillans; Lonchostoma monostylis Sond.; Ptyxostoma monogyna Vahl; Ptyxostoma monostylis (Sond.) Druce

Species of plant

Brunia monogyna is a shrub belonging to the genus Brunia. The species is endemic to the Western Cape and is part of the fynbos.
