= Berzelia burchellii =

Scientific classification
- Kingdom: Plantae
- Clade: Tracheophytes
- Clade: Angiosperms
- Clade: Eudicots
- Clade: Asterids
- Order: Bruniales
- Family: Bruniaceae
- Genus: Berzelia
- Species: B. burchellii

Binomial name
- Berzelia burchellii Dümmer

Species of flowering plant

Berzelia burchellii is a shrub that belongs to the family Bruniaceae.

== Description ==
The species is endemic to the Western Cape and is part of the fynbos. It occurs in the Langeberg at Riversdale and has an area of occurrence of 138 km^{2}. The plant is threatened by crop cultivation, forestry activities and invasive plants.
