= Brunia oblongifolia =

Scientific classification
- Kingdom: Plantae
- Clade: Tracheophytes
- Clade: Angiosperms
- Clade: Eudicots
- Clade: Asterids
- Order: Bruniales
- Family: Bruniaceae
- Genus: Brunia
- Species: B. oblongifolia

Binomial name
- Brunia oblongifolia (Pillans) Class.-Bockh. & E.G.H.Oliv.

Synonyms
- Raspalia oblongifolia Pillans

Species of plant

Brunia oblongifolia is a shrub belonging to the genus Brunia. The species is endemic to the Western Cape and is part of the fynbos. It has a range of and occurs in the Waaihoek and Hex River Mountains at altitudes of 1200–1900 m. There are seven known subpopulations and the plant is considered rare.
