= Brunia compacta =

Scientific classification
- Kingdom: Plantae
- Clade: Tracheophytes
- Clade: Angiosperms
- Clade: Eudicots
- Clade: Asterids
- Order: Bruniales
- Family: Bruniaceae
- Genus: Brunia
- Species: B. compacta

Binomial name
- Brunia compacta A.V.Hall

Species of flowering plant

Brunia compacta is a shrub belonging to the genus Brunia. The species is endemic to the Western Cape and is part of the fynbos. It occurs in the southern Cederberg and Koue Bokkeveld. It has a range of 153 km² and is considered rare.
