= Brunia virgata =

Scientific classification
- Kingdom: Plantae
- Clade: Tracheophytes
- Clade: Angiosperms
- Clade: Eudicots
- Clade: Asterids
- Order: Bruniales
- Family: Bruniaceae
- Genus: Brunia
- Species: B. virgata

Binomial name
- Brunia virgata Brongn.

Synonyms
- Mniothamnea passerinoides C.H.Wright; Pseudobaeckea virgata (Brongn.) Nied.; Raspalia virgata (Brongn.) Pillans

Species of plant

Brunia virgata is a shrub belonging to the genus Brunia. The species is endemic to the Western Cape and is part of the fynbos.
