= Brunia esterhuyseniae =

Scientific classification
- Kingdom: Plantae
- Clade: Tracheophytes
- Clade: Angiosperms
- Clade: Eudicots
- Clade: Asterids
- Order: Bruniales
- Family: Bruniaceae
- Genus: Brunia
- Species: B. esterhuyseniae

Binomial name
- Brunia esterhuyseniae (Strid) Class.-Bockh. & E.G.H.Oliv.

Synonyms
- Lonchostoma esterhuyseniae Strid

Species of plant

Brunia esterhuyseniae is a shrub belonging to the genus Brunia. The species is endemic to the Western Cape and is part of the fynbos. It occurs in the Riviersonderend Mountains at Pilaarkop. Here is the only population consisting of fewer than 100 plants.
