= Staavia pinifolia =

Scientific classification
- Kingdom: Plantae
- Clade: Tracheophytes
- Clade: Angiosperms
- Clade: Eudicots
- Clade: Asterids
- Order: Bruniales
- Family: Bruniaceae
- Genus: Staavia
- Species: S. pinifolia

Binomial name
- Staavia pinifolia Willd.

Synonyms
- Staavia dregeana C.Presl

Species of plant

Staavia pinifolia is a perennial, flowering shrub that is part of the Staavia genus. The species is endemic to the Western Cape and is part of the fynbos. The plant occurs in the Cape Peninsula, the Drakenstein Mountains and the Ouhangsberg between Villiersdorp and Robertson.
