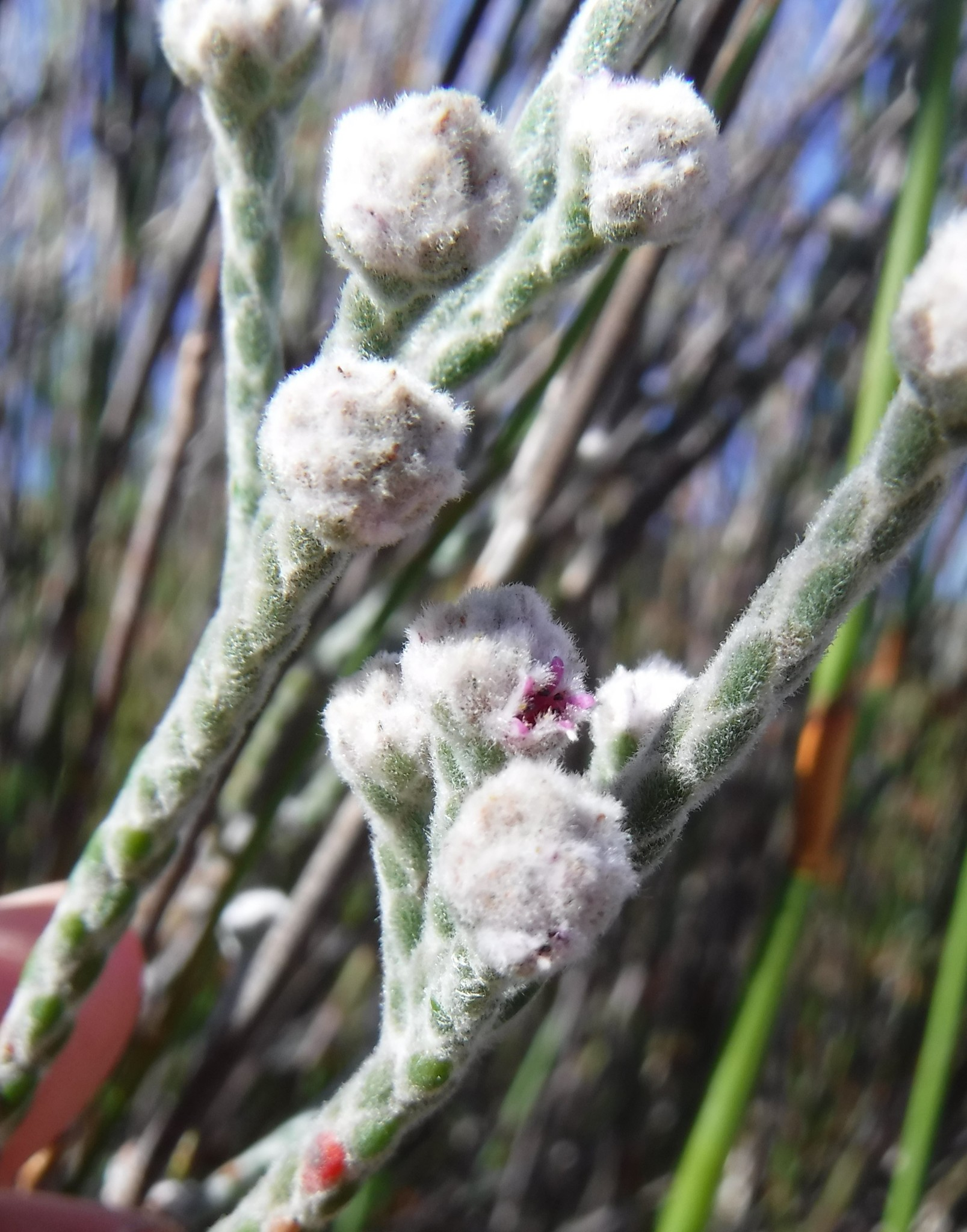

Scientific classification
- Kingdom: Plantae
- Clade: Tracheophytes
- Clade: Angiosperms
- Clade: Eudicots
- Clade: Asterids
- Order: Bruniales
- Family: Bruniaceae
- Genus: Brunia
- Species: B. squalida

Binomial name
- Brunia squalida Sond.

Synonyms
- Pseudobaeckea squalida (Sond.) Nied.; Raspalia globosa (Lam.) Pillans; Raspalia squalida (Sond.) Dümmer; Passerina globosa Lam.

= Brunia squalida =

Species of plant

Brunia squalida, the purple cedar blacktips, is a shrub belonging to the genus Brunia. The species is endemic to the Western Cape and is part of the fynbos.
