= Brunia dregeana =

Scientific classification
- Kingdom: Plantae
- Clade: Tracheophytes
- Clade: Angiosperms
- Clade: Eudicots
- Clade: Asterids
- Order: Bruniales
- Family: Bruniaceae
- Genus: Brunia
- Species: B. dregeana

Binomial name
- Brunia dregeana (Sond.) Class.-Bockh. & E.G.H.Oliv.

Synonyms
- Berardia dregeana Sond.; Berardia velutina Schltr.; Brunia phylicoides E.Mey. ex Harv. & Sond.; Nebelia dregeana (Sond.) Kuntze; Raspalia dregeana (Sond.) Nied.

Species of plant

Brunia dregeana is a shrub belonging to the genus Brunia. The species is endemic to the Western Cape and is part of the fynbos.
