= Brunia purpurea =

Scientific classification
- Kingdom: Plantae
- Clade: Tracheophytes
- Clade: Angiosperms
- Clade: Eudicots
- Clade: Asterids
- Order: Bruniales
- Family: Bruniaceae
- Genus: Brunia
- Species: B. purpurea

Binomial name
- Brunia purpurea (Pillans) Class.-Bockh. & E.G.H.Oliv.

Synonyms
- Lonchostoma purpureum Pillans

Species of plant

Brunia purpurea is a shrub belonging to the genus Brunia. The species is endemic to the Western Cape and is part of the fynbos. It has a range of 305 km² and occurs from Bainskloof to Kogelberg. The plant is considered rare.
