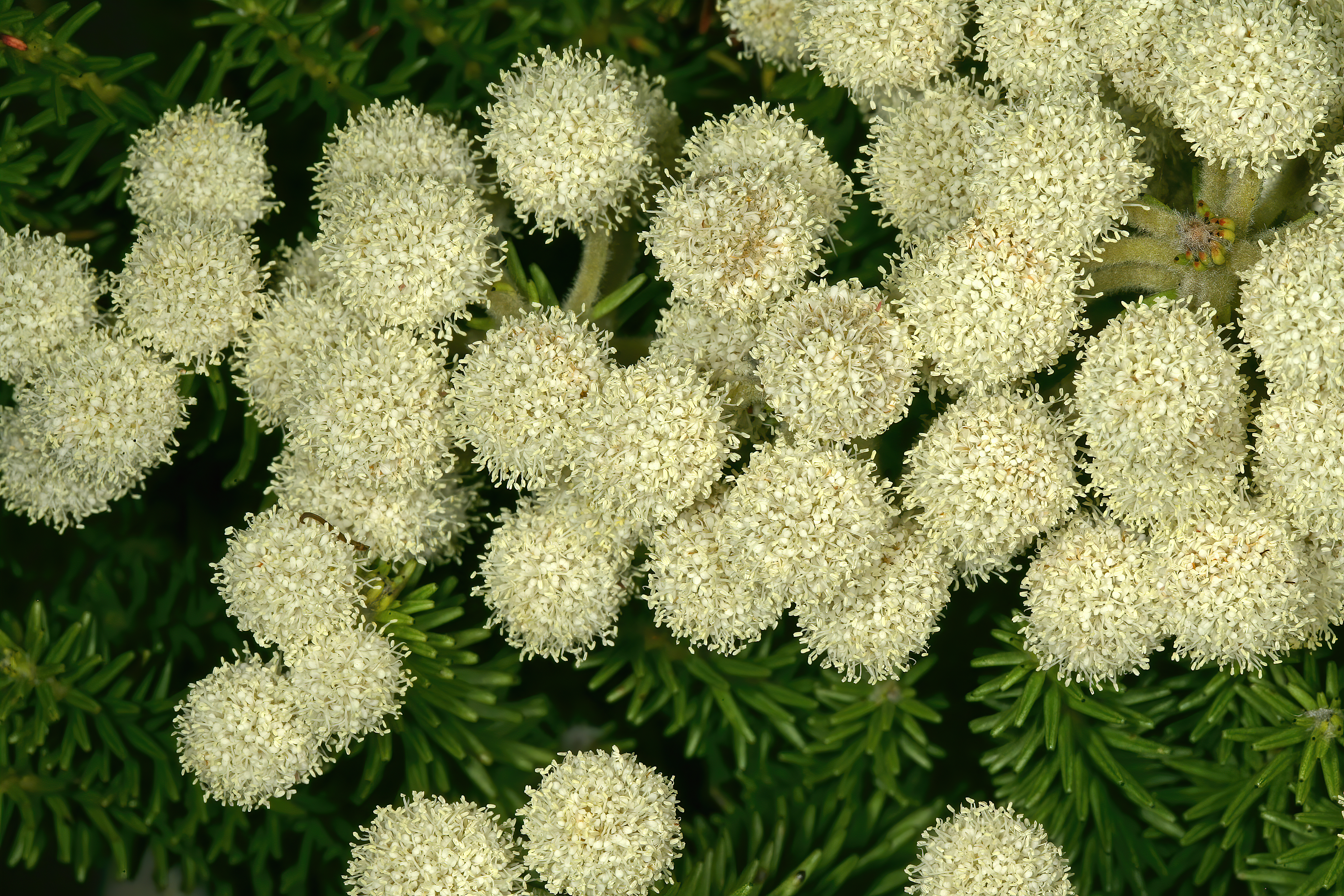

Scientific classification
- Kingdom: Plantae
- Clade: Tracheophytes
- Clade: Angiosperms
- Clade: Eudicots
- Clade: Asterids
- Order: Bruniales
- Family: Bruniaceae
- Genus: Berzelia
- Species: B. squarrosa

Binomial name
- Berzelia squarrosa (Thunb.) Sond., (1862)

Synonyms
- Berzelia superba Eckl. & Zeyh.; Brunia ericoides J.C.Wendl.; Brunia lanuginosa Thunb.; Brunia plumosa Lam.; Brunia sericea Dum.Cours.; Brunia speciosa Dum.Cours.; Brunia squarrosa Thunb.

= Berzelia squarrosa =

Species of flowering plant

Berzelia squarrosa is a shrub that belongs to the family Bruniaceae. The species is endemic to the Western Cape and is part of the fynbos.
