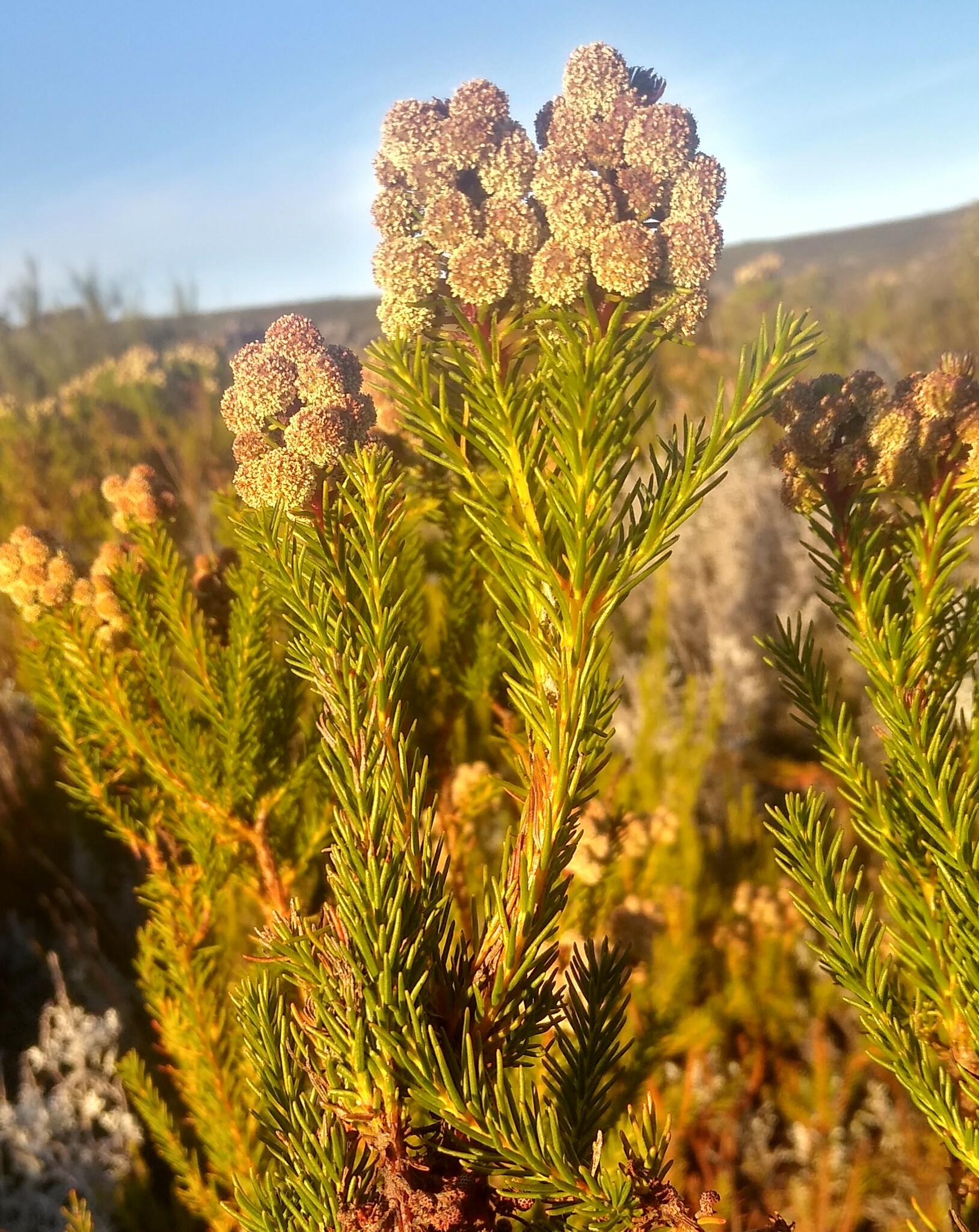

Scientific classification
- Kingdom: Plantae
- Clade: Tracheophytes
- Clade: Angiosperms
- Clade: Eudicots
- Clade: Asterids
- Order: Bruniales
- Family: Bruniaceae
- Genus: Berzelia
- Species: B. arachnoidea

Binomial name
- Berzelia arachnoidea (J.C.Wendl.) Eckl. & Zeyh.

Synonyms
- Brunia arachnoidea J.C.Wendl.

= Berzelia arachnoidea =

Species of flowering plant

Berzelia arachnoidea is a shrub that belongs to the Bruniaceae family. The species is endemic to the Western Cape and is part of the fynbos.
