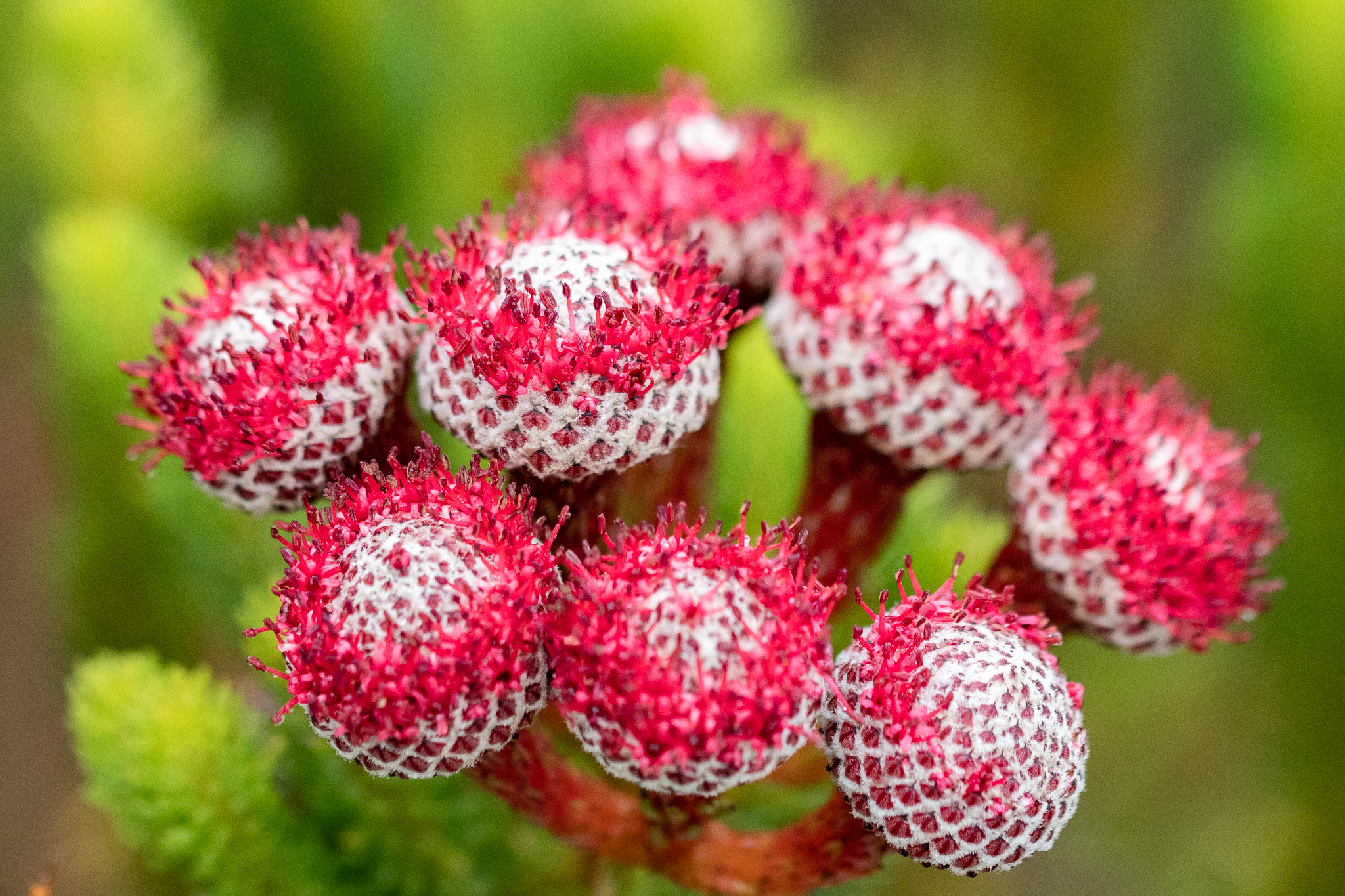

Scientific classification
- Kingdom: Plantae
- Clade: Tracheophytes
- Clade: Angiosperms
- Clade: Eudicots
- Clade: Asterids
- Order: Bruniales
- Family: Bruniaceae
- Genus: Berzelia
- Species: B. stokoei

Binomial name
- Berzelia stokoei (E.Phillips) A.V.Hall, (2011)

Synonyms
- Brunia stokoei E.Phillips

= Berzelia stokoei =

Species of flowering plant

Berzelia stokoei is a shrub that belongs to the Bruniaceae family. The species is endemic to the Western Cape and is part of the fynbos.
