= Brunia phylicoides =

Scientific classification
- Kingdom: Plantae
- Clade: Tracheophytes
- Clade: Angiosperms
- Clade: Eudicots
- Clade: Asterids
- Order: Bruniales
- Family: Bruniaceae
- Genus: Brunia
- Species: B. phylicoides

Binomial name
- Brunia phylicoides Thunb.

Synonyms
- Berardia phylicoides Brongn.; Brunia deusta Willd.; Brunia passerinoides Schltdl.; Nebelia phylicoides (Thunb.) Sweet; Raspalia passerinoides C.Presl; Raspalia phylicoides (Thunb.) Arn.; Phylica squamosa Willd. ex Schult.

Species of plant

Brunia phylicoides, the silver cedar blacktips, is a shrub belonging to the genus Brunia. The species is endemic to the Western Cape and is part of the fynbos.
