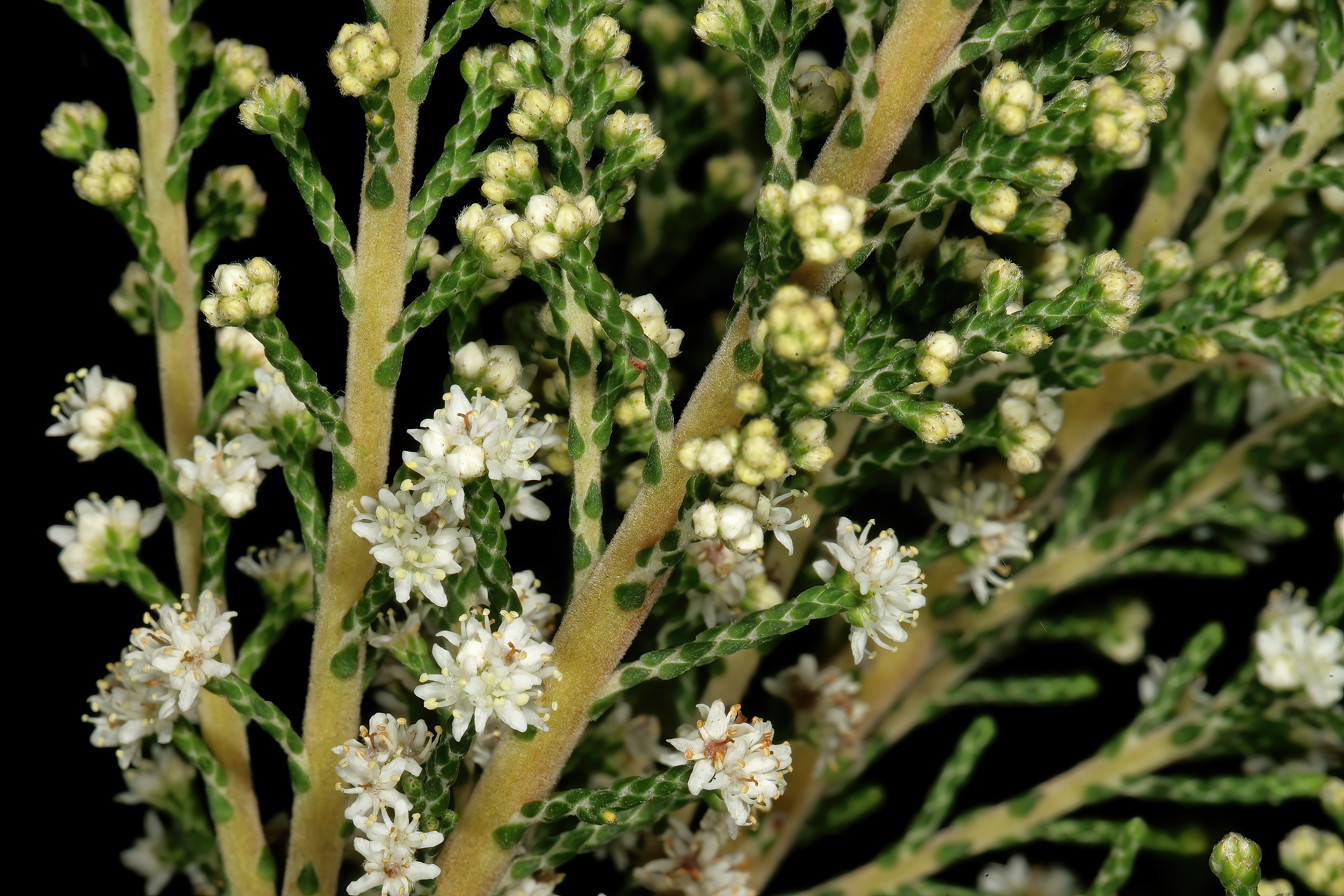

Scientific classification
- Kingdom: Plantae
- Clade: Tracheophytes
- Clade: Angiosperms
- Clade: Eudicots
- Clade: Asterids
- Order: Bruniales
- Family: Bruniaceae
- Genus: Brunia
- Species: B. trigyna

Binomial name
- Brunia trigyna (Schltr.) Class.-Bockh. & E.G.H.Oliv.

Synonyms
- Berardia trigyna Schltr.; Raspalia trigyna (Schltr.) Dümmer

= Brunia trigyna =

Species of plant

Brunia trigyna, the Pondoland ghost-bush, is a shrub or small tree belonging to the genus Brunia. The species is endemic to KwaZulu-Natal and the Eastern Cape. The species has a range of 100 km². This plant's numbers have been declining since the 1900s due to habitat destruction and by 1960 its numbers were critically low. One subpopulation has recently been discovered, currently there are only three subpopulations and the total number of plants is only 12. It occurs only at the Umtamvuna Nature Reserve and at Mkambati.
