= Berzelia ecklonii =

Scientific classification
- Kingdom: Plantae
- Clade: Tracheophytes
- Clade: Angiosperms
- Clade: Eudicots
- Clade: Asterids
- Order: Bruniales
- Family: Bruniaceae
- Genus: Berzelia
- Species: B. ecklonii

Binomial name
- Berzelia ecklonii Pillans, (1947)

Synonyms
- Berzelia intermedia var. alopecuroides Dümmer

Species of flowering plant

Berzelia ecklonii is a shrub that belongs to the Bruniaceae family. The species is endemic to the Western Cape and is part of the fynbos. The plant occurs in the mountains between Grabouw and Pringle Bay. It has an area of occurrence of 272 km^{2} and the plant is considered rare.
