= Brunia callunoides =

Scientific classification
- Kingdom: Plantae
- Clade: Tracheophytes
- Clade: Angiosperms
- Clade: Eudicots
- Clade: Asterids
- Order: Bruniales
- Family: Bruniaceae
- Genus: Brunia
- Species: B. callunoides

Binomial name
- Brunia callunoides (Oliv.) Class.-Bockh. & E.G.H.Oliv.

Synonyms
- Berzelia callunoides Oliv.; Mniothamnea callunioides (Oliv.) Nied.; Mniothamnea micrantha Schltr.

Species of flowering plant

Brunia callunoides is a shrub belonging to the genus Brunia. The species is endemic to the Western Cape and is part of the fynbos. It occurs in the Langeberg. There are fewer than five subpopulations and the plant is threatened by invasive plants such as Pinus species.
