= Adeps =

Adeps may refer to:

- Adeps, a genus of beetles in the family Tenebrionidae, synonym of Adepsion
- Adeps, a genus of amphipods in the family Corophiidae, synonym of Audouinia
- adeps lanae, greasy substance

== See also ==
- ADEPS
