= Brunia pillansii =

Scientific classification
- Kingdom: Plantae
- Clade: Tracheophytes
- Clade: Angiosperms
- Clade: Eudicots
- Clade: Asterids
- Order: Bruniales
- Family: Bruniaceae
- Genus: Brunia
- Species: B. pillansii

Binomial name
- Brunia pillansii Class.-Bockh. & E.G.H.Oliv.

Synonyms
- Pseudobaeckea stokoei Pillans

Species of plant

Brunia pillansii, the alpine streambush, is a shrub belonging to the genus Brunia. The species is endemic to the Western Cape and is part of the fynbos. It occurs in the Kleinrivier Mountains.

The species was observed for the first time in 100 years in 2022 in the Vogelgat Nature Reserve.
