= Brunia palustris =

Scientific classification
- Kingdom: Plantae
- Clade: Tracheophytes
- Clade: Angiosperms
- Clade: Eudicots
- Clade: Asterids
- Order: Bruniales
- Family: Bruniaceae
- Genus: Brunia
- Species: B. palustris

Binomial name
- Brunia palustris (Schltr. ex Dümmer) Class.-Bockh. & E.G.H.Oliv.

Synonyms
- Pseudobaeckea palustris Schltr. ex Dümmer; Raspalia palustris (Schltr. ex Dümmer) Pillans

Species of plant

Brunia palustris is a shrub belonging to the genus Brunia. The species is endemic to the Western Cape and is part of the fynbos.
