= Brunia pentandra =

Scientific classification
- Kingdom: Plantae
- Clade: Tracheophytes
- Clade: Angiosperms
- Clade: Eudicots
- Clade: Asterids
- Order: Bruniales
- Family: Bruniaceae
- Genus: Brunia
- Species: B. pentandra

Binomial name
- Brunia pentandra (Thunb.) Class.-Bockh. & E.G.H.Oliv.

Synonyms
- Lonchostoma obtusiflorum Wikstr.; Lonchostoma pentandrum (Thunb.) Druce; Ptyxostoma pentandrum (Thunb.) Druce; Gnidia pentandra (Thunb.) Thunb.; Passerina pentandra Thunb.; Stilbe myrtifolia Poir.

Species of plant

Brunia pentandra is a shrub belonging to the genus Brunia. The species is endemic to the Western Cape and is part of the fynbos. The plant has a range of 1170 km². It occurs from the Cederberg and Kouebokkeveld Mountains to the Witsenberg Plains. (pages needed)
