= Brunia angulata =

Scientific classification
- Kingdom: Plantae
- Clade: Tracheophytes
- Clade: Angiosperms
- Clade: Eudicots
- Clade: Asterids
- Order: Bruniales
- Family: Bruniaceae
- Genus: Brunia
- Species: B. angulata

Binomial name
- Brunia angulata (Sond.) Class.-Bockh. & E.G.H.Oliv.

Synonyms
- Berardia angulata Sond.; Nebelia angulata (Sond.) Kuntze; Raspalia struthioloides C.Presl

Species of flowering plant

Brunia angulata is a shrub belonging to the genus Brunia. The species is endemic to the Western Cape and is part of the fynbos.
