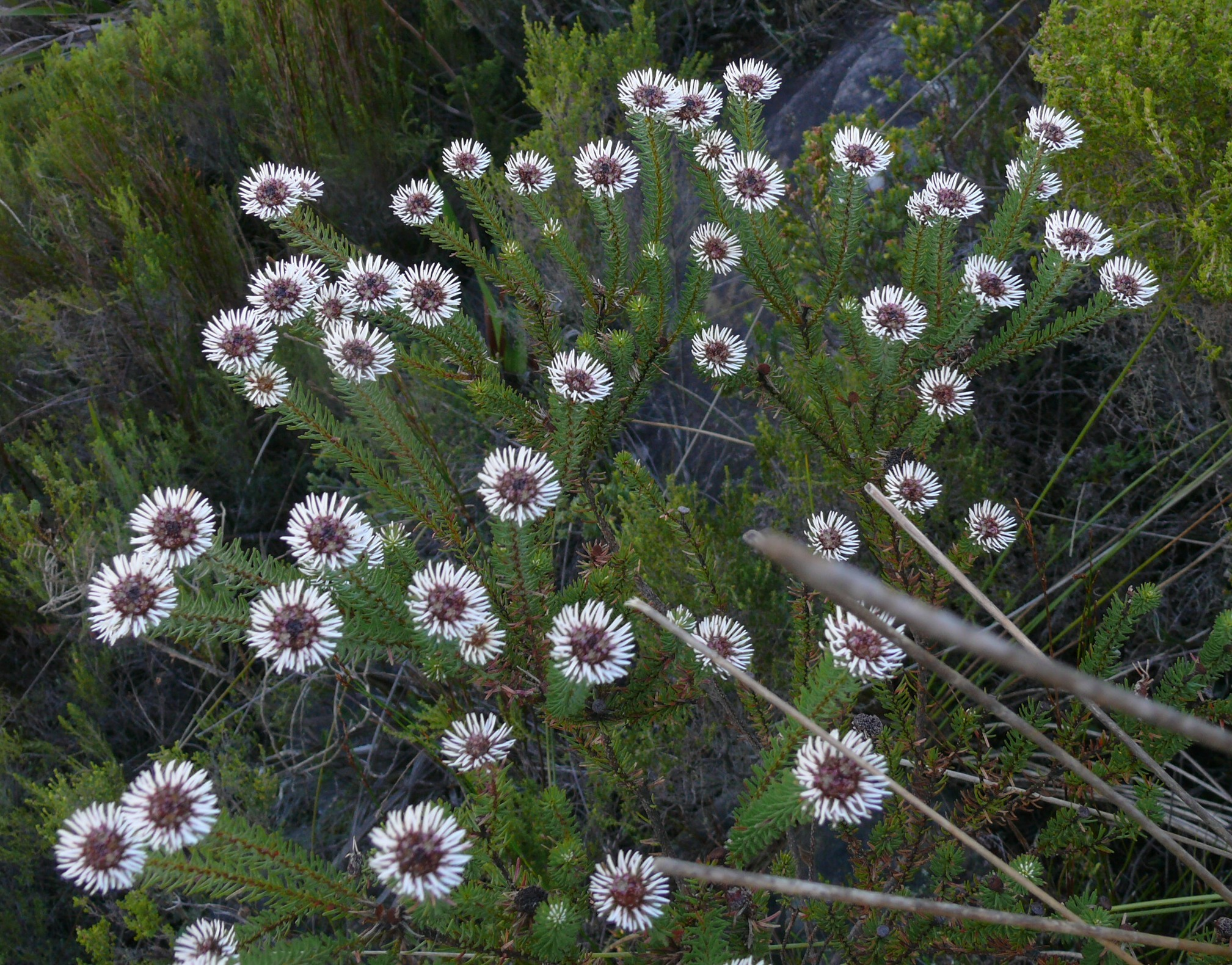

Scientific classification
- Kingdom: Plantae
- Clade: Tracheophytes
- Clade: Angiosperms
- Clade: Eudicots
- Clade: Asterids
- Order: Bruniales
- Family: Bruniaceae
- Genus: Staavia
- Species: S. glutinosa

Binomial name
- Staavia glutinosa (P.J.Bergius) Dahl

= Staavia glutinosa =

Species of plant

Staavia glutinosa is a perennial, flowering shrub that is part of the Staavia genus. The species is endemic to the Western Cape and is part of the fynbos. The plant occurs in the Table Mountain National Park in five subpopulations, has a range of only 70 km² and is considered rare.
