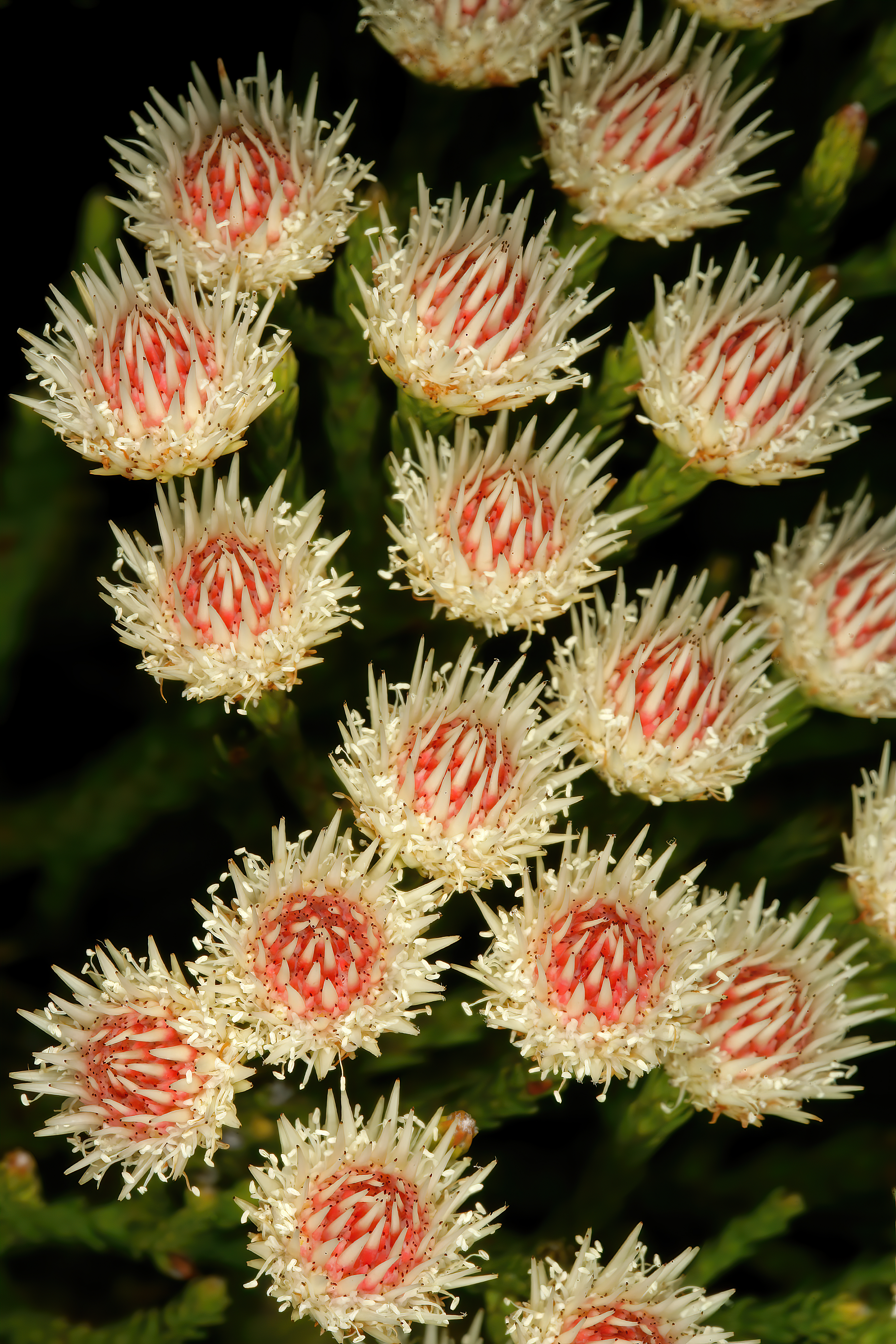

Scientific classification
- Kingdom: Plantae
- Clade: Tracheophytes
- Clade: Angiosperms
- Clade: Eudicots
- Clade: Asterids
- Order: Bruniales
- Family: Bruniaceae
- Genus: Brunia
- Species: B. paleacea

Binomial name
- Brunia paleacea P.J.Bergius

Synonyms
- Berardia paleacea (P.J.Bergius) Brongn.; Brunia thunbergiana D.Dietr.; Nebelia paleacea (P.J.Bergius) Sweet

= Brunia paleacea =

Species of plant

Brunia paleacea is a shrub belonging to the genus Brunia. The species is endemic to the Western Cape and is part of the fynbos.
