= Berzelia commutata =

Scientific classification
- Kingdom: Plantae
- Clade: Tracheophytes
- Clade: Angiosperms
- Clade: Eudicots
- Clade: Asterids
- Order: Bruniales
- Family: Bruniaceae
- Genus: Berzelia
- Species: B. commutata

Binomial name
- Berzelia commutata Sond.

Synonyms
- Berzelia comosa Eckl. & Zeyh.

Species of plant

Berzelia commutata is a shrub that belongs to the family Bruniaceae. The species is endemic to the Western Cape and is part of the fynbos.
