= Brunia villosa =

Scientific classification
- Kingdom: Plantae
- Clade: Tracheophytes
- Clade: Angiosperms
- Clade: Eudicots
- Clade: Asterids
- Order: Bruniales
- Family: Bruniaceae
- Genus: Brunia
- Species: B. villosa

Binomial name
- Brunia villosa E.Mey. ex Sond.

Synonyms
- Pseudobaeckea villosa (E.Mey. ex Sond.) Nied.; Raspalia villosa C.Presl

Species of plant

Brunia villosa is a shrub belonging to the genus Brunia. The species is endemic to the Western Cape and is part of the fynbos.
