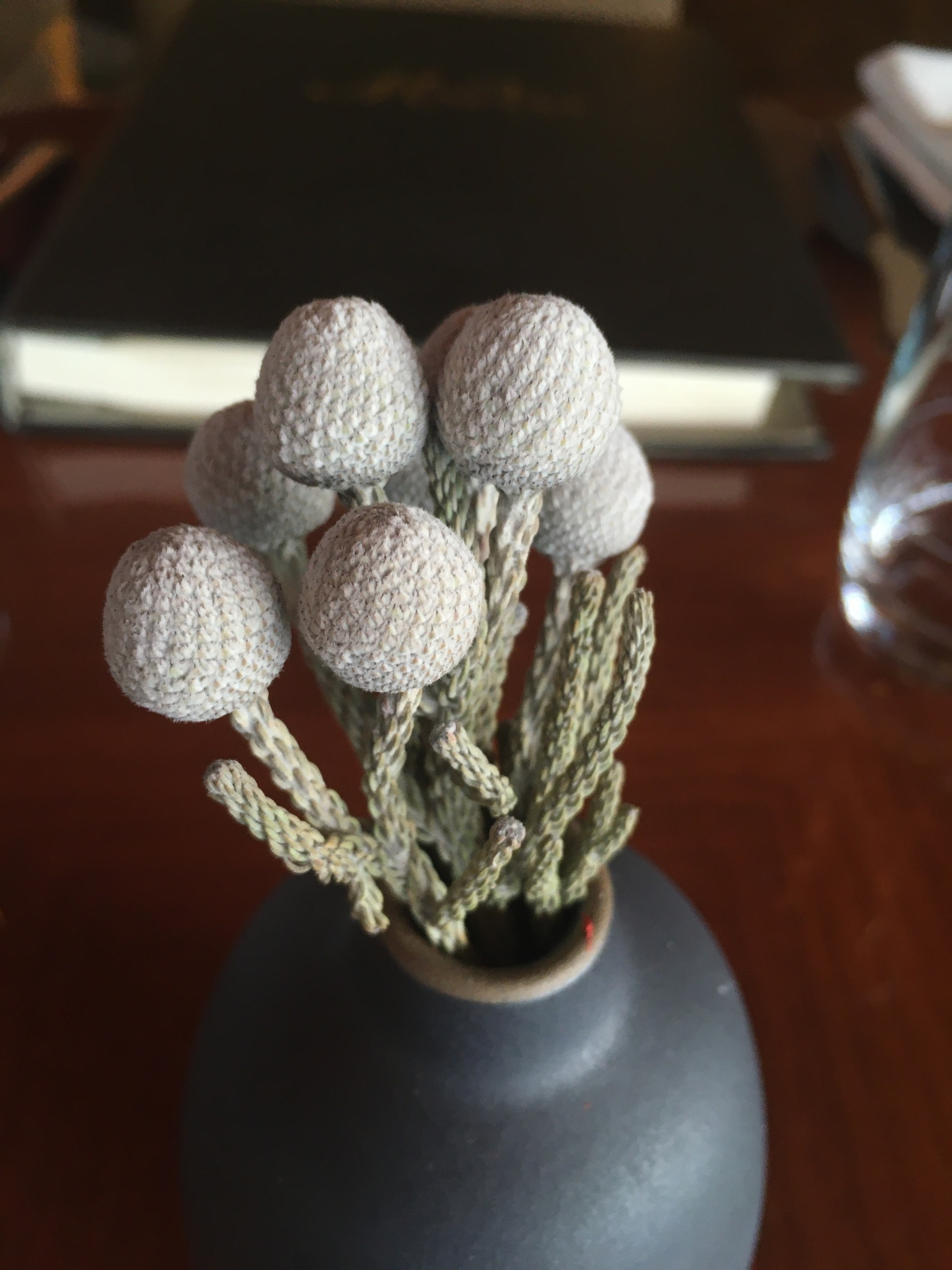

Scientific classification
- Kingdom: Plantae
- Clade: Tracheophytes
- Clade: Angiosperms
- Clade: Eudicots
- Clade: Asterids
- Order: Bruniales
- Family: Bruniaceae
- Genus: Brunia
- Species: B. noduliflora

Binomial name
- Brunia noduliflora Goldblatt & J.C.Manning

Synonyms
- Barreria capensis L.

= Brunia noduliflora =

Species of plant

Brunia noduliflora is a species of flowering plant in the Family Bruniaceae. It is commonly called the cone stompie in English or knoppiesbos in Afrikaans, is an evergreen shrub native to South Africa.

== Description ==
Brunia noduliflora has a woody rootstock from which many stems sprout. Their ericoid leaves are stalkless and resemble triangular or lance-shaped overlapping scales. Their spherical, cream inflorescences have long stamens, giving them a "fluffy" appearance. These flowers are short-lived, but their globose grey-brown seedheads are more persistent.

== Range ==
Brunia noduliflora is endemic to the southern and southwestern Cape of Africa. It is common from the Olifants River Mountains to Piketberg, the Cape Peninsula, Jonkershoek, Hottentots Holland Mountains, and the Kogelberg through to the Hermanus and Elim. It can also be found around the Van Stadens Mountains and around Uitenhage.

== Habitat ==
This shrub is found at low to high altitudes, on hills and rocky sandstone slopes.

== Ecology ==
Brunia noduliflora is endemic to fynbos grassland where periodic fires are common. A fire-adapted plant, it has two strategies for surviving fires - reseeding and resprouting. Its underground woody rootstock, or lignotuber, resprouts the following year during autumn, while seeds retained in its seedheads are dispersed after being released by burning.

== Etymology ==
The generic name Brunia may honor either Cornelius Brun, an apothecary and contemporary of Linnaeus, or the ship surgeon and botanical collector Alexander Brown. The specific epithet noduliflora is derived from Latin and describes its flowering habit - "nodulus" meaning "knot" and "flos" meaning flower - thus, "knotted flowers".

== Horticulture ==
B. noduliflora, being a serotinous plant, requires special treatment of its seeds to simulate post-fire conditions in order to germinate. Cuttings from its stems can also be propagated. It is best planted in well-draining fynbos gardens with acidic soil.

== Uses ==
It is sometimes used in floral arrangement for its unusual seedheads and long-lasting foliage. It is available under the trade name "Spray Brunia".
