= Audouinia hispida =

Scientific classification
- Kingdom: Plantae
- Clade: Tracheophytes
- Clade: Angiosperms
- Clade: Eudicots
- Clade: Asterids
- Order: Bruniales
- Family: Bruniaceae
- Genus: Audouinia
- Species: A. hispida

Binomial name
- Audouinia hispida (Pillans) Class.-Bockh. & E.G.H.Oliv.

Synonyms
- Tittmannia hispida Pillans

Species of plant

Audouinia hispida is a perennial shrub that is part of the Audouinia genus. The species is endemic to the Western Cape and is part of the fynbos.
