= Audouinia esterhuyseniae =

Scientific classification
- Kingdom: Plantae
- Clade: Tracheophytes
- Clade: Angiosperms
- Clade: Eudicots
- Clade: Asterids
- Order: Bruniales
- Family: Bruniaceae
- Genus: Audouinia
- Species: A. esterhuyseniae

Binomial name
- Audouinia esterhuyseniae (Powrie) A.V.Hall

Synonyms
- Tittmannia esterhuyseniae Powrie

Species of plant

Audouinia esterhuyseniae is a perennial shrub that is part of the Audouinia genus. The species is endemic to the Western Cape and occurs in the Hex River Mountains and the Stettynsberg. There are two subpopulations and one is threatened by pine plantations, which are an invasive plant. The plant is part of the fynbos.
