= Berzelia dregeana =

Scientific classification
- Kingdom: Plantae
- Clade: Tracheophytes
- Clade: Angiosperms
- Clade: Eudicots
- Clade: Asterids
- Order: Bruniales
- Family: Bruniaceae
- Genus: Berzelia
- Species: B. dregeana

Binomial name
- Berzelia dregeana Colozza

Species of flowering plant

Berzelia dregeana is a shrub that belongs to the Bruniaceae family. The species is endemic to the Western Cape and is part of the fynbos. The plant occurs from the Kogelberg to Bettys Bay. It has an area of occurrence of 210 km² and there are five subpopulations. The species falls under the protection of the Kogelberg Nature Reserve and has no threats. The plant is considered rare.
