= Brunia macrocephala =

Scientific classification
- Kingdom: Plantae
- Clade: Tracheophytes
- Clade: Angiosperms
- Clade: Eudicots
- Clade: Asterids
- Order: Bruniales
- Family: Bruniaceae
- Genus: Brunia
- Species: B. macrocephala

Binomial name
- Brunia macrocephala Willd.

Synonyms
- Brunia marlothii Schltr.

Species of flowering plant

Brunia macrocephala is a shrub belonging to the genus Brunia. The species is endemic to the Western Cape and is part of the fynbos. The plant occurs from Du Toitskloof to the Hex River Mountains and Kwadousberg. It has a range of 700 square kilometres (270 square miles) and is not threatened.
