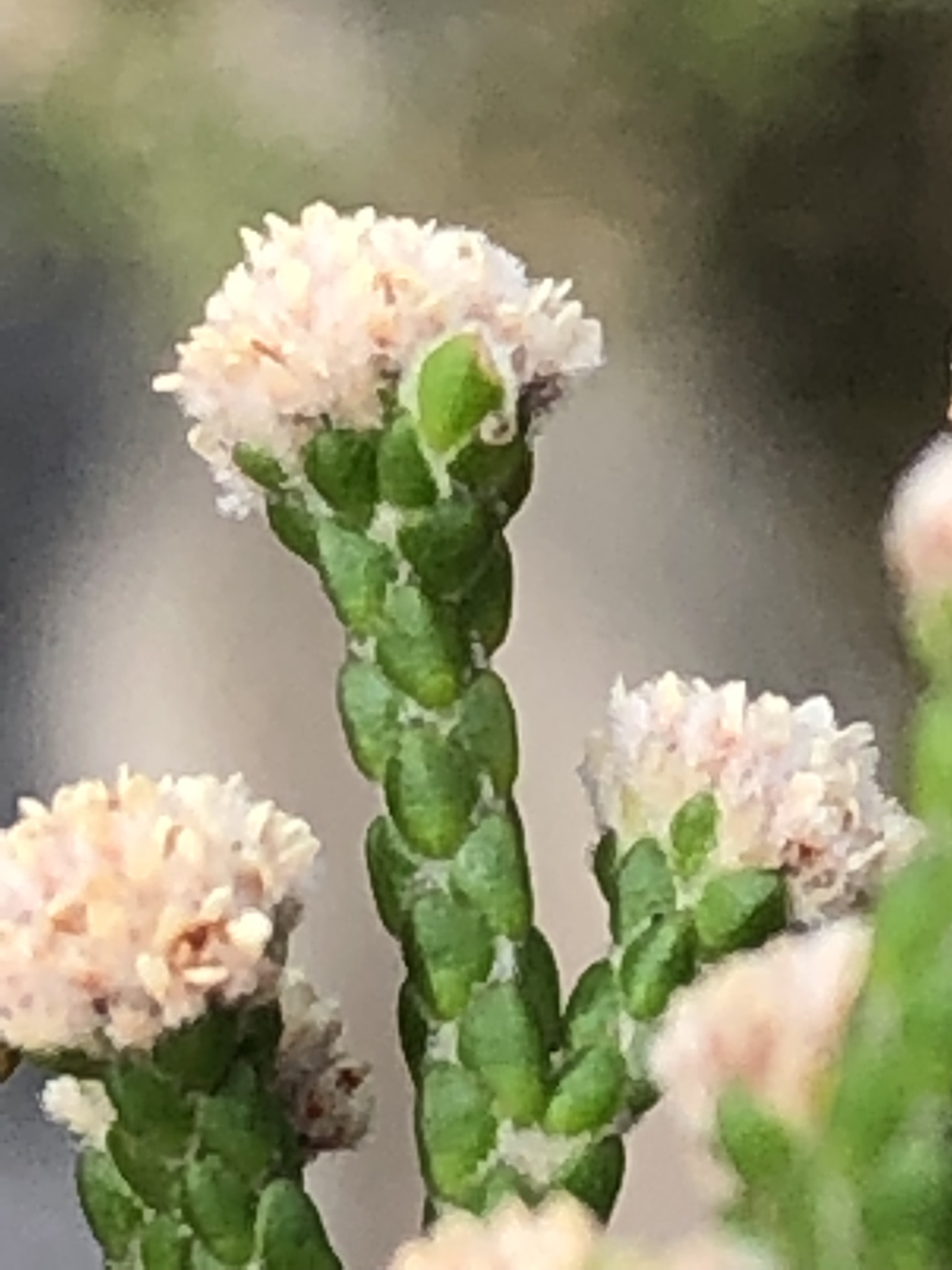

Scientific classification
- Kingdom: Plantae
- Clade: Tracheophytes
- Clade: Angiosperms
- Clade: Eudicots
- Clade: Asterids
- Order: Bruniales
- Family: Bruniaceae
- Genus: Brunia
- Species: B. microphylla

Binomial name
- Brunia microphylla Thunb.

Synonyms
- Berardia microphylla (Thunb.) Sond.; Brunia deusta Thunb.; Brunia verticillata Thunb.; Nebelia microphylla (Thunb.) Kuntze; Raspalia microphylla (Thunb.) Brongn.; Raspalia teres E.Mey.

= Brunia microphylla =

Species of flowering plant

Brunia microphylla is a shrub belonging to the genus Brunia. The species is endemic to the Western Cape and is part of the fynbos. The plant occurs from the Limietberg, north of Bainskloof, southwards to mountains north of Betty's Bay and Kleinmond, and from there eastwards to the Riviersonderend Mountains and Kleinrivier Mountains as far as Bredasdorp.
