= Brunia sacculata =

Scientific classification
- Kingdom: Plantae
- Clade: Tracheophytes
- Clade: Angiosperms
- Clade: Eudicots
- Clade: Asterids
- Order: Bruniales
- Family: Bruniaceae
- Genus: Brunia
- Species: B. sacculata

Binomial name
- Brunia sacculata (Bolus ex Pillans) Class.-Bockh. & E.G.H.Oliv.

Synonyms
- Pseudobaeckea sacculata Dümmer; Raspalia sacculata (Dümmer) Pillans

Species of plant

Brunia sacculata is a shrub belonging to the genus Brunia. The species is endemic to the Western Cape and is part of the fynbos.
