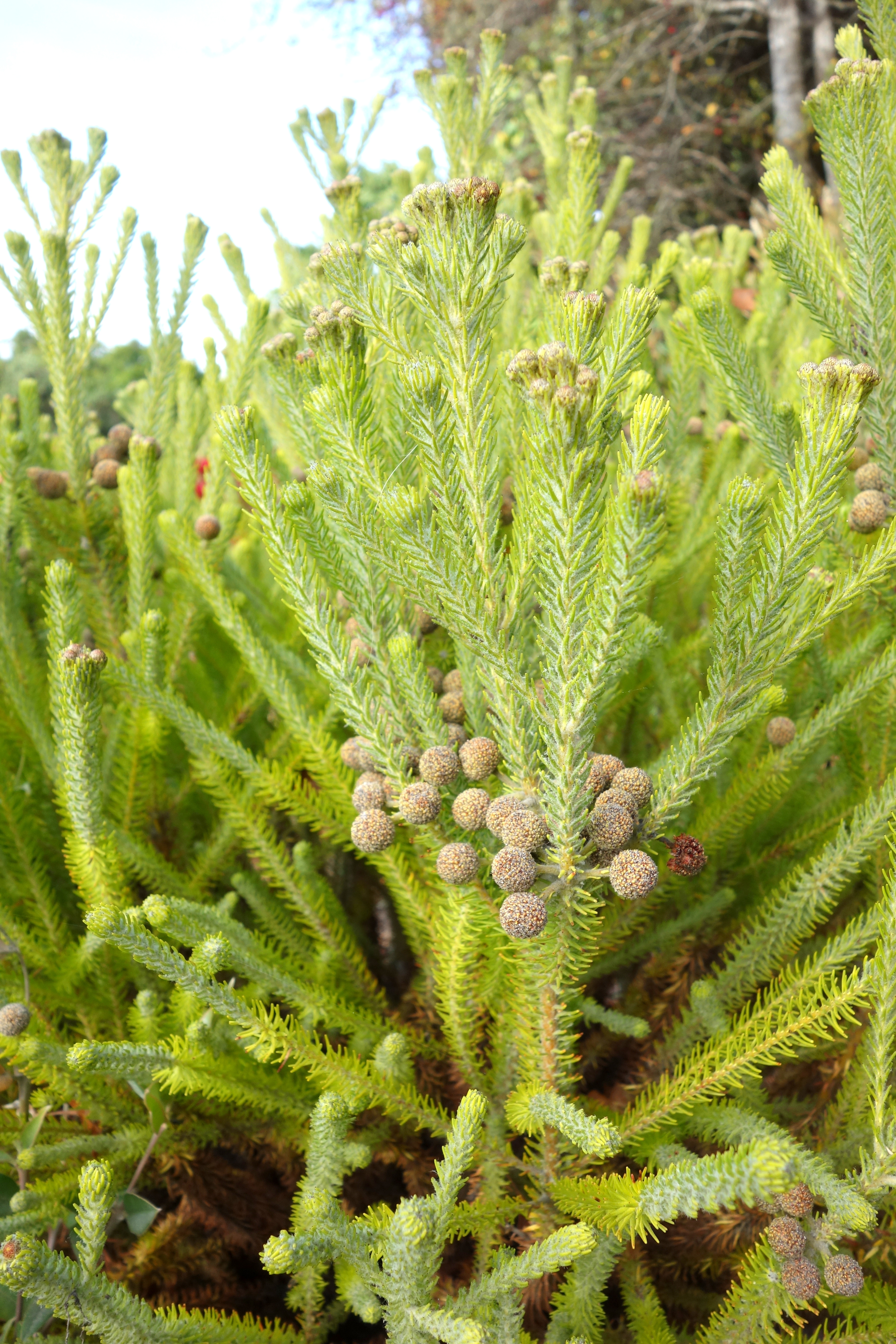

Conservation status
- Vulnerable (IUCN 3.1)

Scientific classification
- Kingdom: Plantae
- Clade: Tracheophytes
- Clade: Angiosperms
- Clade: Eudicots
- Clade: Asterids
- Order: Bruniales
- Family: Bruniaceae
- Genus: Berzelia
- Species: B. rubra

Binomial name
- Berzelia rubra Schltdl., (1831)

Synonyms
- Brunia rubra Willd.; Berzelia squarrosa var. reflexa Sond.

= Berzelia rubra =

Species of flowering plant

Berzelia rubra is a shrub that belongs to the family Bruniaceae. The species is endemic to the Western Cape and is part of the fynbos. The plant occurs in the Kleinrivier Mountains and has an area of occurrence of less than 10 km^{2}. The plant is threatened by the invasive plants such as Pinus and Hakea species.
