= Audouinia laxa =

Scientific classification
- Kingdom: Plantae
- Clade: Tracheophytes
- Clade: Angiosperms
- Clade: Eudicots
- Clade: Asterids
- Order: Bruniales
- Family: Bruniaceae
- Genus: Audouinia
- Species: A. laxa

Binomial name
- Audouinia laxa (Thunb.) A.V.Hall

Synonyms
- Brunia laxa Thunb.; Moesslera lateriflora (Brongn.) Eckl. & Zeyh.; Thamnea laxa (Thunb.) Baill.; Tittmannia lateriflora Brongn.; Tittmannia laxa (Thunb.) C.Presl; Tittmannia laxa var. langebergensis Pillans; Tittmannia oliveri Dümmer; Tittmannia pruinosa Dümmer

Species of plant

Audouinia laxa is a perennial shrub that is part of the Audouinia genus. The species is endemic to the Western Cape and is part of the fynbos. The plant occurs from the Cederberg to Du Toit's Kloof and eastwards to the Langeberg and Swartberg.
