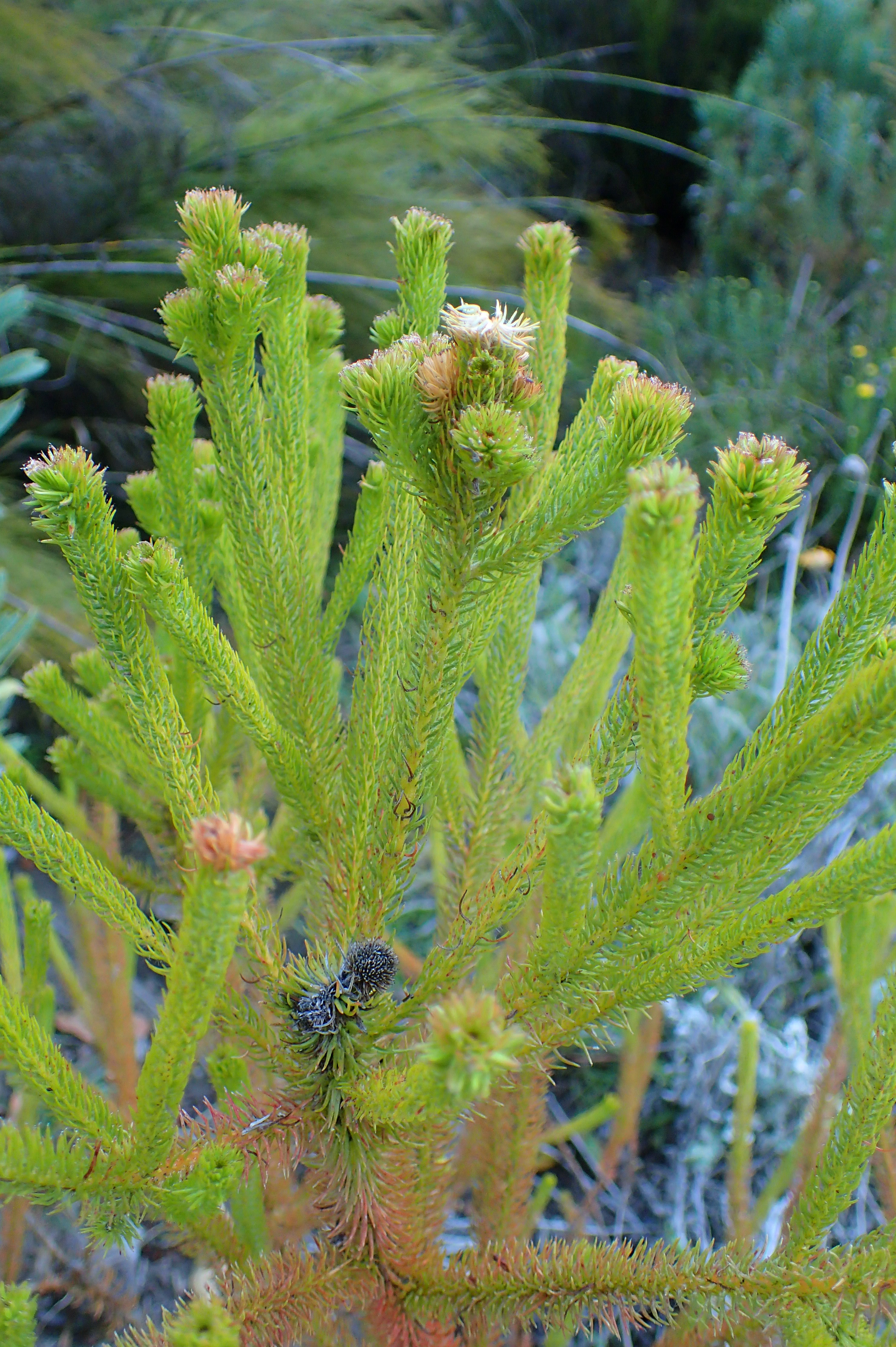

Scientific classification
- Kingdom: Plantae
- Clade: Tracheophytes
- Clade: Angiosperms
- Clade: Eudicots
- Clade: Asterids
- Order: Bruniales
- Family: Bruniaceae
- Genus: Berzelia
- Species: B. galpinii

Binomial name
- Berzelia galpinii Pillans (1947)

= Berzelia galpinii =

Species of flowering plant

Berzelia galpinii is a shrub that belongs to the Bruniaceae family. The species is endemic to the Western Cape and is part of the fynbos. The plant occurs in the Langeberg, between Suurbraakberg and Garcia's Pass. It has an area of occurrence of 300 km^{2} and the plant is considered rare. There are less than ten subpopulations.
