= Brunia powrieae =

Scientific classification
- Kingdom: Plantae
- Clade: Tracheophytes
- Clade: Angiosperms
- Clade: Eudicots
- Clade: Asterids
- Order: Bruniales
- Family: Bruniaceae
- Genus: Brunia
- Species: B. powrieae

Binomial name
- Brunia powrieae Class.-Bockh. & E.G.H.Oliv.

Synonyms
- Nebelia stokoei Pillans

Species of plant

Brunia powrieae is a shrub belonging to the genus Brunia. The species is endemic to the Western Cape and is part of the fynbos. It occurs in the Koue Bokkeveld and Hex River Mountains. It has a range of less than 50 km² and there are three subpopulations. The plant is considered rare.
