= Brunia cordata =

Scientific classification
- Kingdom: Plantae
- Clade: Tracheophytes
- Clade: Angiosperms
- Clade: Eudicots
- Clade: Asterids
- Order: Bruniales
- Family: Bruniaceae
- Genus: Brunia
- Species: B. cordata

Binomial name
- Brunia cordata (Burm.f.) Walp.

Synonyms
- Baeckea cardata Burm.f.; Baeckea cordata Burm.f.; Baeckea lancifolia Eckl. & Zeyh.; Baeckea racemosa Eckl. & Zeyh.; Brunia imbricata Sweet; Brunia racemosa Brongn.; Pseudobaeckea cordata (Burm.f.) Nied.; Pseudobaeckea gracilis Dümmer; Pseudobaeckea thymeleoides Schltr.; Phylica imbricata Thunb.; Phylica racemosa L.

Species of plant

Brunia cordata is a shrub belonging to the genus Brunia. The species is endemic to the Western Cape and is part of the fynbos. It occurs in the southern Cederberg and Koue Bokkeveld. It has a range of 153 km² and is considered rare.
