= Staavia staavioides =

Scientific classification
- Kingdom: Plantae
- Clade: Tracheophytes
- Clade: Angiosperms
- Clade: Eudicots
- Clade: Asterids
- Order: Bruniales
- Family: Bruniaceae
- Genus: Staavia
- Species: S. staavioides

Binomial name
- Staavia staavioides (Sond.) A.V.Hall

Synonyms
- Brunia capitellata E.Mey. ex Harv. & Sond.; Brunia staavioides Sond.; Pseudobaeckea capitellata Nied.; Raspalia capitella C.Presl; Raspalia staavioides (Sond.) Pillans

Species of plant

Staavia staavioides is a perennial, flowering shrub that is part of the Staavia genus. The species is endemic to the Western Cape and is part of the fynbos.
