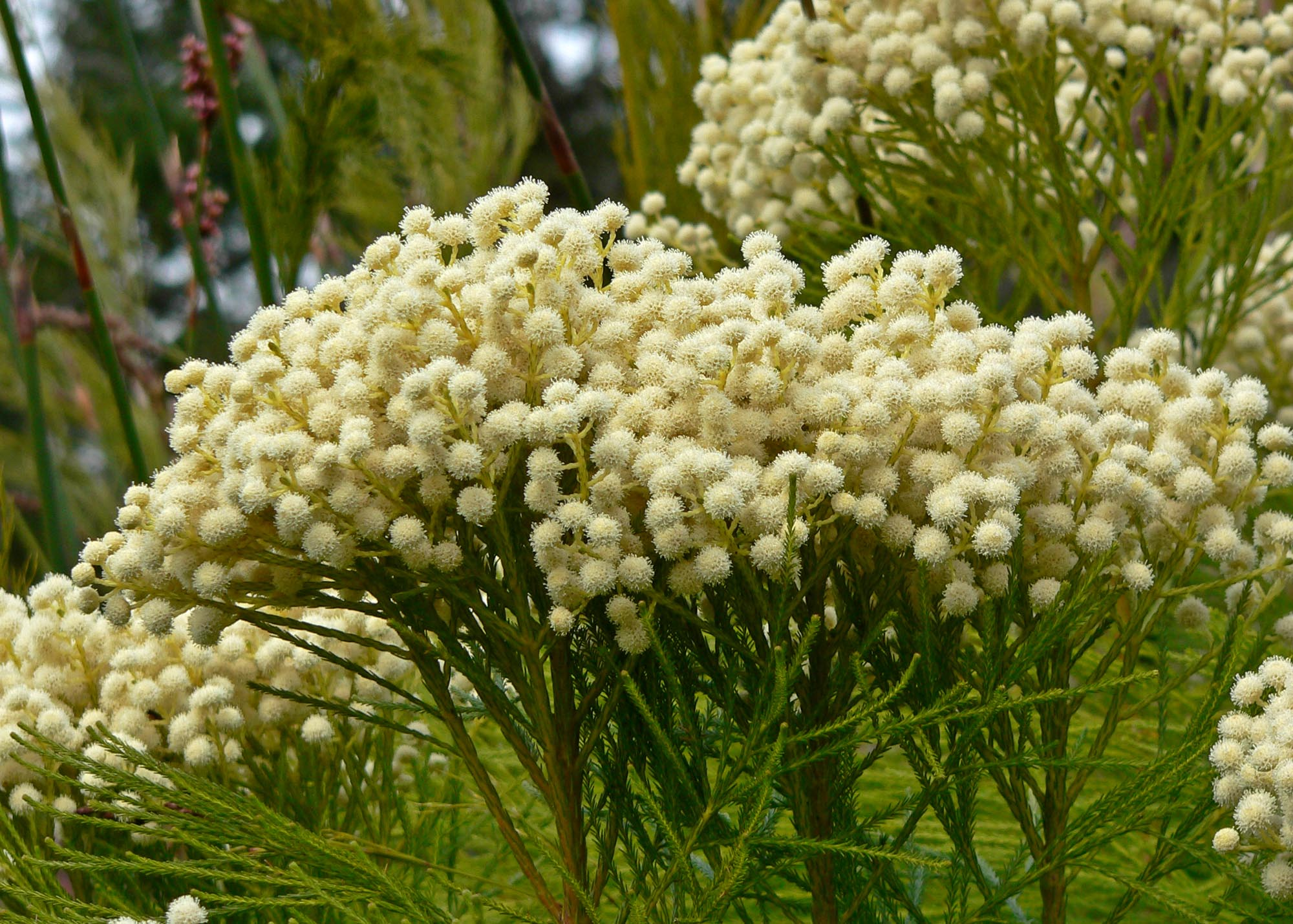
- Berzelia lanuginosa

Scientific classification
- Kingdom: Plantae
- Clade: Tracheophytes
- Clade: Angiosperms
- Clade: Eudicots
- Clade: Asterids
- Order: Bruniales
- Family: Bruniaceae
- Genus: Berzelia; Brongn.

Species
- See text.

Synonyms
- Rabenhorstia Rchb. in Deut. Bot. Herb.-Buch: 159 (1841)

= Berzelia =

Genus of flowering plants

Berzelia is a genus consisting of 12 species of upright, wiry-stemmed, evergreen shrubs from Cape Provinces in South Africa.

The genus was first published and described in Ann. Sci. Nat. (Paris) vol.8 on page 370 in 1826.

== Description ==
They have a dense covering of small, fine, needle-like leaves. The flowers which appear in spring and summer, are minute but are packed in spherical clusters, of which there are several per head of bloom. The flowers are white to cream and, because the stamens extend beyond the tiny petals, the flower heads appear to be studded with protrusions.

In cultivation, they are best grown in light well-drained soil with adequate moisture, positioning in full sun. Light trimming will retain the compact form after flowering. Most species are easily propagated from seed or small half-hardened tip cuttings.

== Species ==
As accepted by Plants of the World Online;

- Berzelia abrotanoides (L.) Brongn.
- Berzelia albiflora (E.Phillips) Class.-Bockh. & E.G.H.Oliv.
- Berzelia alopecuroides (Thunb.) Sond.
- Berzelia arachnoidea (J.C.Wendl.) Eckl. & Zeyh.
- Berzelia burchellii Dümmer
- Berzelia commutata Sond.
- Berzelia cordifolia Schltdl.
- Berzelia dregeana Colozza
- Berzelia ecklonii Pillans
- Berzelia galpinii Pillans
- Berzelia incurva Pillans
- Berzelia intermedia Schltdl.
- Berzelia lanuginosa (L.) Brongn.
- Berzelia rubra Schltdl.
- Berzelia squarrosa (Thunb.) Sond.
- Berzelia stokoei (E.Phillips) A.V.Hall

== Other sources ==
- Botanica Sistematica
