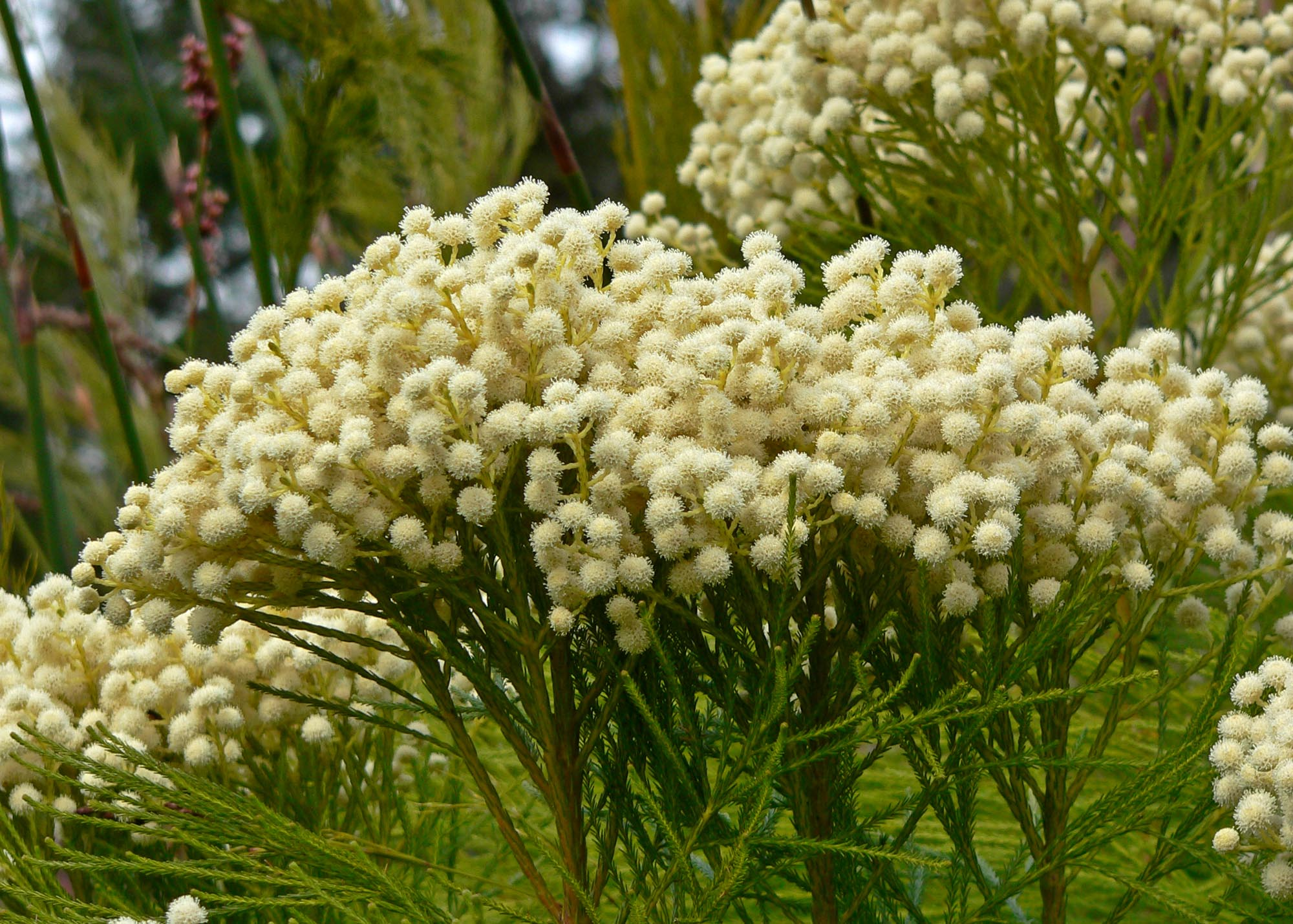
- Berzelia lanuginosa

Scientific classification
- Kingdom: Plantae
- Clade: Tracheophytes
- Clade: Angiosperms
- Clade: Eudicots
- Clade: Asterids
- Order: Bruniales
- Family: Bruniaceae
- Genus: Berzelia
- Species: B. lanuginosa

Binomial name
- Berzelia lanuginosa (L.) Brongn.

Synonyms
- Brunia lanuginosa L.

= Berzelia lanuginosa =

Species of flowering plant

Berzelia lanuginosa, commonly known as common button bush, is a species of flowering plant in the family Bruniaceae native to the Western Cape region of South Africa. It is a perennial shrub that is hardy from USDA hardiness zones 9a to 11. It grows to be 4 to 6 feet (1.2 to 1.8 m) tall.

Carl Linnaeus, the "father of taxonomy", described it as Brunia lanuginosa in volume one of his Species Plantarum in 1753. French botanist erected the genus Berzelia, giving it the binomial name Berzelia lanuginosa in 1826.
