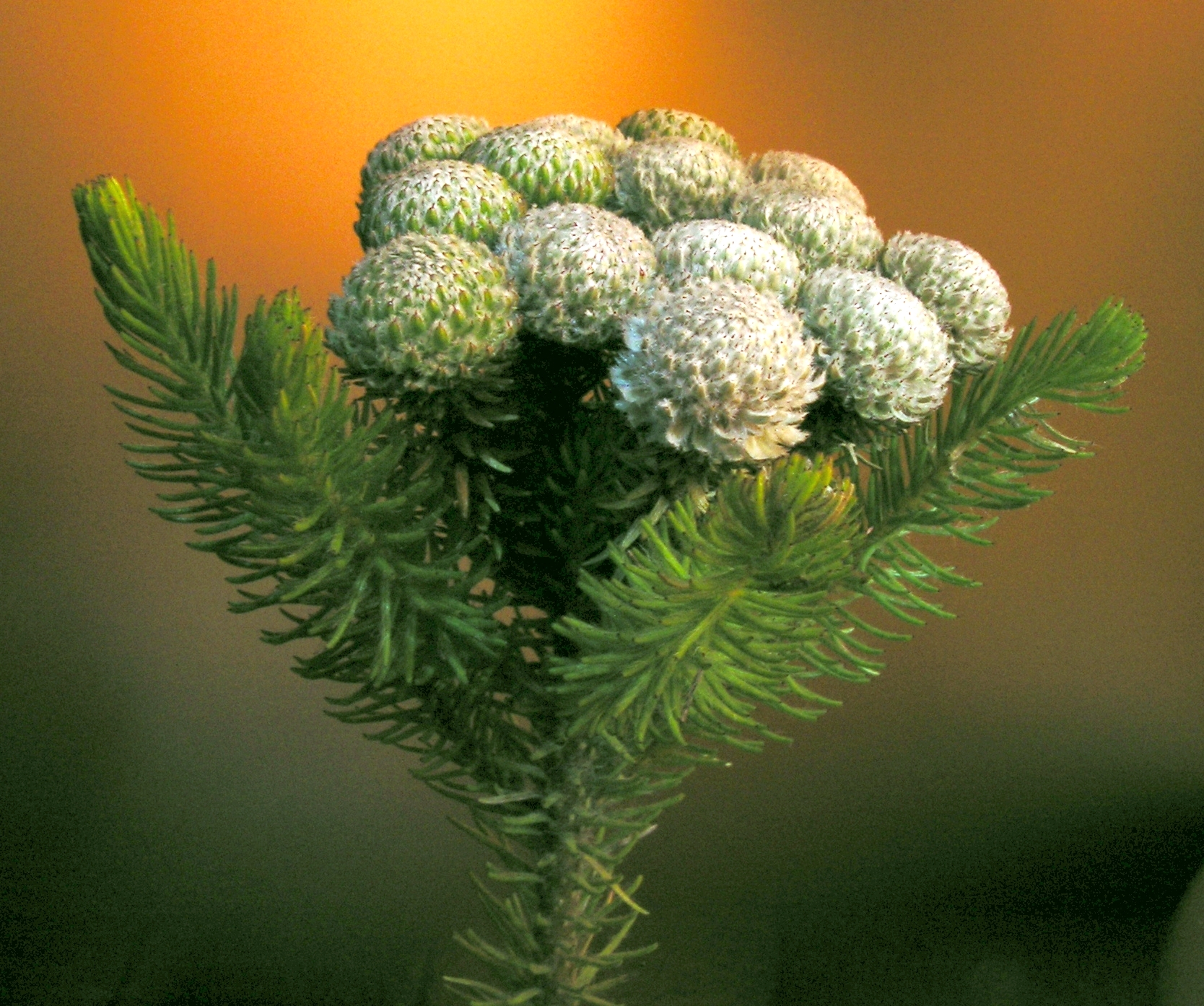
- The leaves and the knobby inflorescences of Brunia sp. (family Bruniaceae)

Scientific classification
- Kingdom: Plantae
- Clade: Tracheophytes
- Clade: Angiosperms
- Clade: Eudicots
- Clade: Asterids
- Order: Bruniales
- Family: Bruniaceae
- Genus: Brunia; Lam.

= Brunia (plant) =

Genus of flowering plants

Brunia is a genus of shrubs of the family Bruniaceae, native to the cape region of South Africa.

== Taxonomy ==
The genus was described by Carl Linnaeus and published in Species Plantarum 1: 199 in the year 1753. The type species is Brunia paleacea P.J.Bergius, Descriptiones Plantarum ex Capite Bonae Spei, 56. (1767)

The name Brunia is thought to have been derived from the apothecary, Dr Cornelis Brun, who travelled in Russia and the Levant, although it could also be in commemoration of Dr Alexander Brown, a ship's surgeon and a collector who worked in the East Indies around 1690.

== Species ==
As accepted by Plants of the World Online;

- Brunia africana (Burm.f.) Class.-Bockh. & E.G.H.Oliv.
- Brunia angulata (Sond.) Class.-Bockh. & E.G.H.Oliv.
- Brunia barnardii (Pillans) Class.-Bockh. & E.G.H.Oliv.
- Brunia bullata (Schltr.) Class.-Bockh. & E.G.H.Oliv.
- Brunia callunoides (Oliv.) Class.-Bockh. & E.G.H.Oliv.
- Brunia compacta A.V.Hall
- Brunia cordata (Burm.f.) Walp.
- Brunia dregeana (Sond.) Class.-Bockh. & E.G.H.Oliv.
- Brunia esterhuyseniae (Strid) Class.-Bockh. & E.G.H.Oliv.
- Brunia fragarioides Willd.
- Brunia laevis Thunb.
- Brunia latebracteata A.V.Hall
- Brunia macrocephala Willd.
- Brunia microphylla Thunb.
- Brunia monogyna (Vahl) Class.-Bockh. & E.G.H.Oliv.
- Brunia monostyla (Pillans) Class.-Bockh. & E.G.H.Oliv.
- Brunia myrtoides (Vahl) Class.-Bockh. & E.G.H.Oliv.
- Brunia neglecta Schltr.
- Brunia noduliflora Goldblatt & J.C.Manning
- Brunia oblongifolia (Pillans) Class.-Bockh. & E.G.H.Oliv.
- Brunia paleacea P.J.Bergius
- Brunia palustris (Schltr. ex Dümmer) Class.-Bockh. & E.G.H.Oliv.
- Brunia pentandra (Thunb.) Class.-Bockh. & E.G.H.Oliv.
- Brunia phylicoides Thunb.
- Brunia pillansii Class.-Bockh. & E.G.H.Oliv.
- Brunia powrieae Class.-Bockh. & E.G.H.Oliv.
- Brunia purpurea (Pillans) Class.-Bockh. & E.G.H.Oliv.
- Brunia sacculata (Dümmer) ined.
- Brunia schlechteri (Dümmer) Class.-Bockh. & E.G.H.Oliv.
- Brunia sphaerocephala (Sond.) A.V.Hall
- Brunia squalida Sond.
- Brunia thomae Class.-Bockh. & E.G.H.Oliv.
- Brunia trigyna (Schltr.) Class.-Bockh. & E.G.H.Oliv.
- Brunia tulbaghensis (Schltr. ex Dümmer) Class.-Bockh. & E.G.H.Oliv.
- Brunia variabilis (Pillans) Class.-Bockh. & E.G.H.Oliv.
- Brunia villosa E.Mey. ex Sond.
- Brunia virgata Brongn.

The genus is accepted by United States Department of Agriculture and the Agricultural Research Service, but they only accept Brunia albiflora, Brunia lanuginosa,Brunia nodiflora, Brunia noduliflora, Brunia paleacea and Brunia stokoei. Kew accepts the above species except Brunia nodiflora.

== Other sources ==
- Lamarck, J-B. 1785. Encyclopédie Méthodique, Botanique 1(2): 474
