= Linconia (plant) =

Scientific classification
- Kingdom: Plantae
- Clade: Tracheophytes
- Clade: Angiosperms
- Clade: Eudicots
- Clade: Asterids
- Order: Bruniales
- Family: Bruniaceae
- Genus: Linconia; L.

Species
- See text

Genus of flowering plants

Linconia is a genus of flowering shrubs belonging to the family Bruniaceae. The genus is endemic to South Africa and all the species are part of the fynbos.

== Species ==
- Linconia alopecuroidea L.
- Linconia cuspidata (Thunb.) Sw.
- Linconia ericoides E.G.H.Oliv.
