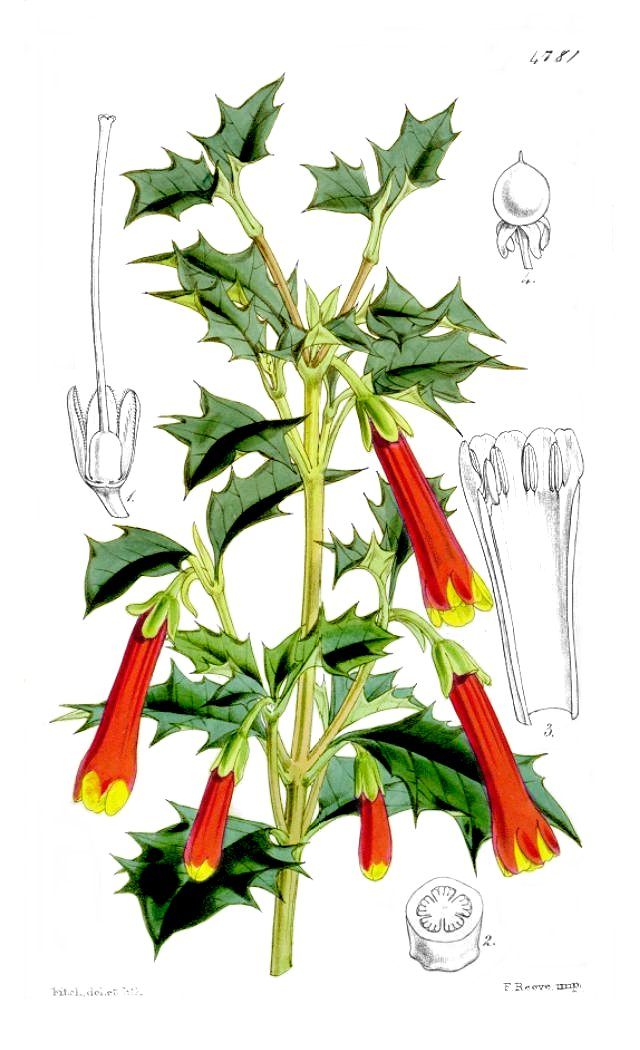
- Desfontainia spinosa

Scientific classification
- Kingdom: Plantae
- Clade: Embryophytes
- Clade: Tracheophytes
- Clade: Spermatophytes
- Clade: Angiosperms
- Clade: Eudicots
- Clade: Asterids
- Order: Bruniales
- Family: Columelliaceae; D.Don

Genera
- Columellia; Desfontainia

= Columelliaceae =

Family of flowering plants

Columelliaceae is a family of trees and shrubs native to the Andes of South America.

In the APG II taxonomy it is placed in the order Lamiales, but a 2008 study suggested that the family is sister to the Bruniaceae, and the Angiosperm Phylogeny Website proposes incorporating this finding by placing both families in order Bruniales. The APG III system of 2009 thus does place Columelliaceae in the Bruniales.
