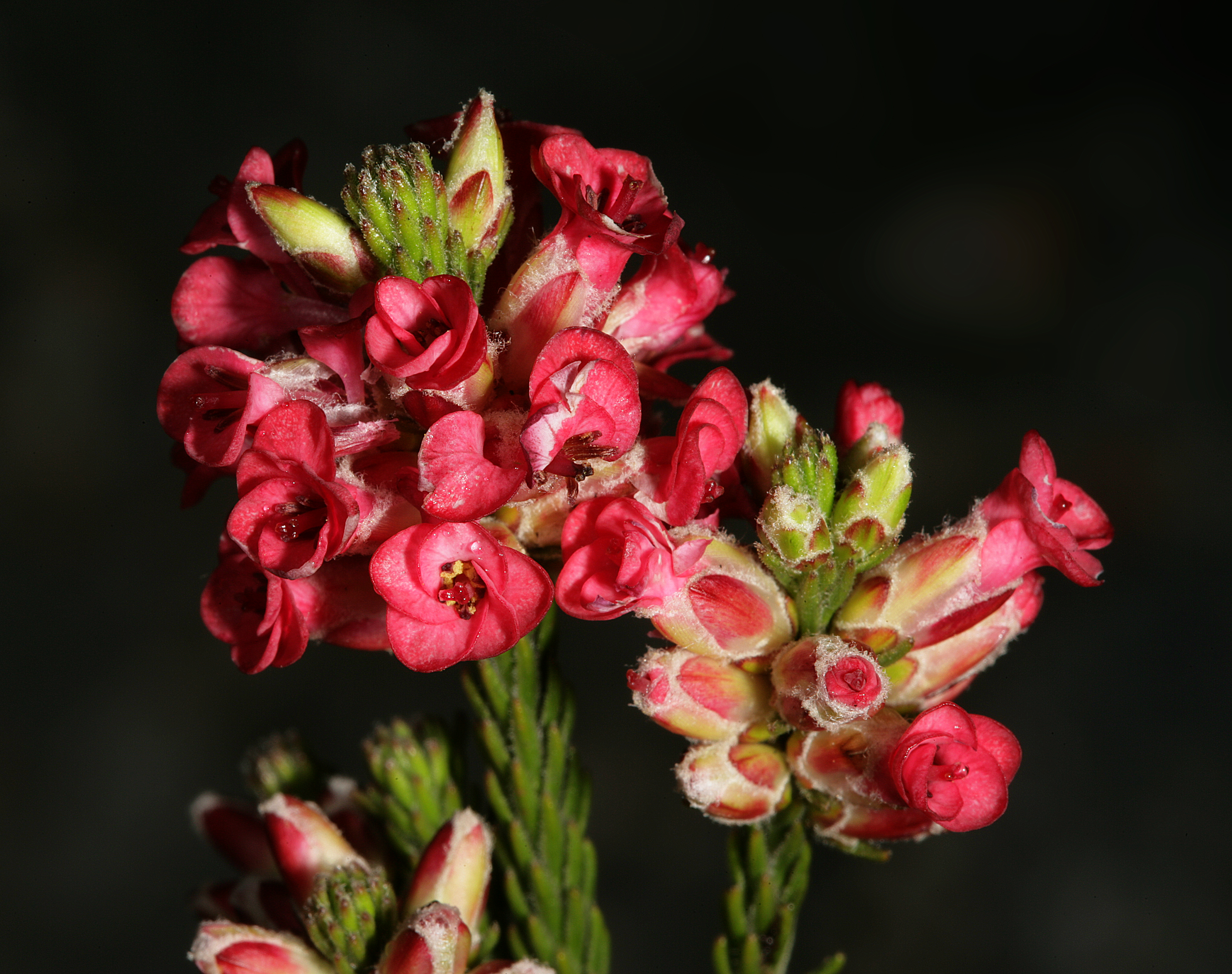
- Audouinia capitata

Scientific classification
- Kingdom: Plantae
- Clade: Tracheophytes
- Clade: Angiosperms
- Clade: Eudicots
- Clade: Asterids
- Order: Bruniales
- Family: Bruniaceae
- Genus: Audouinia; Brongn.

= Audouinia =

Genus of flowering plants

Audouinia is a genus of flowering plants belonging to the family Bruniaceae.

Its native range is South African Republic.

Species:

- Audouinia capitata (L.) Brongn.
- Audouinia esterhuyseniae (Powrie) A.V.Hall
- Audouinia hispida (Pillans) Class.-Bockh. & E.G.H.Oliv.
- Audouinia laevis (Pillans) A.V.Hall
- Audouinia laxa (Thunb.) A.V.Hall
