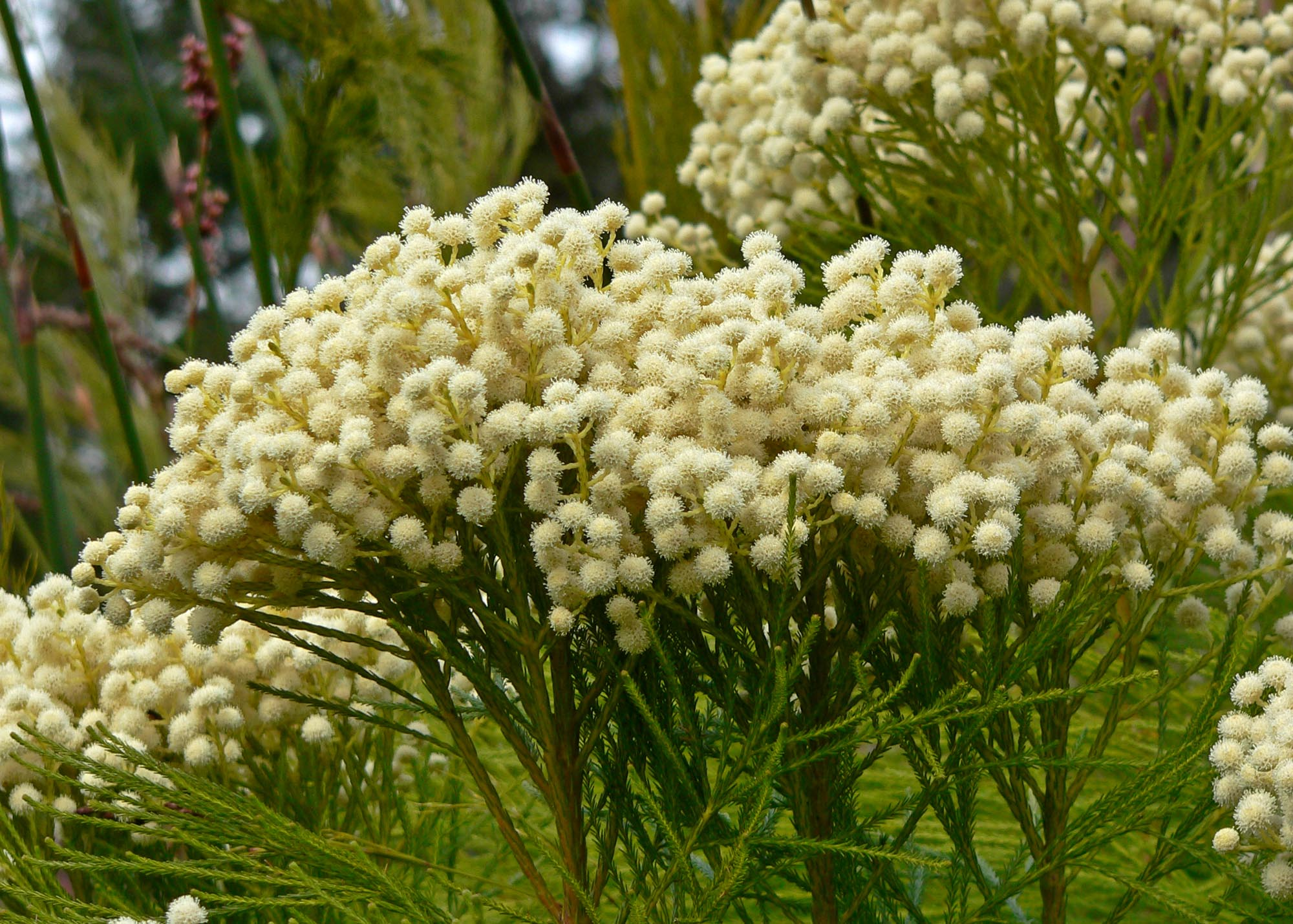
- Berzelia lanuginosa

Scientific classification
- Kingdom: Plantae
- Clade: Tracheophytes
- Clade: Angiosperms
- Clade: Eudicots
- Clade: Asterids
- Order: Bruniales
- Family: Bruniaceae; R.Br. ex DC.

Genera
- See text

= Bruniaceae =

Family of flowering plants comprising South African heath-like shrubs

Bruniaceae is a family of shrubs native to the cape region of South Africa. They are mostly restricted to the Cape Province, but a small number of species occur in KwaZulu-Natal.

== Description ==
Species belonging to the Bruniaceae are heath-like shrubs. They have small, hard, scaly leaves that are alternate but regularly set and overlapping. A distinct character is the minute black tip of the leaves when these are young. The inflorescence is a dense spike or spherical flowerhead with up to 400 flowers at the end of the stems. Individual flowers are tube-shaped and hermaphrodite, there are five sepals which may be free or connected at their rim, while the ovary sits under the other parts of the flower. The fruit is dry when ripe, opens with two or four valves and contains fleshy seeds.

== Taxonomy ==
In the APG II taxonomy they are placed in the order Lamiales, but a 2008 study suggested that they are sister to the Columelliaceae, and the Angiosperm Phylogeny Website proposes incorporating this finding by placing both families in order Bruniales.

== Genera ==
There are twelve genera, totalling 77 species:

- Audouinia Brongn.
- Berzelia Brongn.
- Brunia Lam.
- Linconia L.
- Lonchostoma Wikstr.
- Mniothamnea (Oliv.) Nied.
- Nebelia Neck. ex Sweet
- Pseudobaeckea Nied.
- Raspalia Brongn.
- Staavia Dahl
- Thamnea Sol. ex Brongn.
- Tittmannia Brongn.
