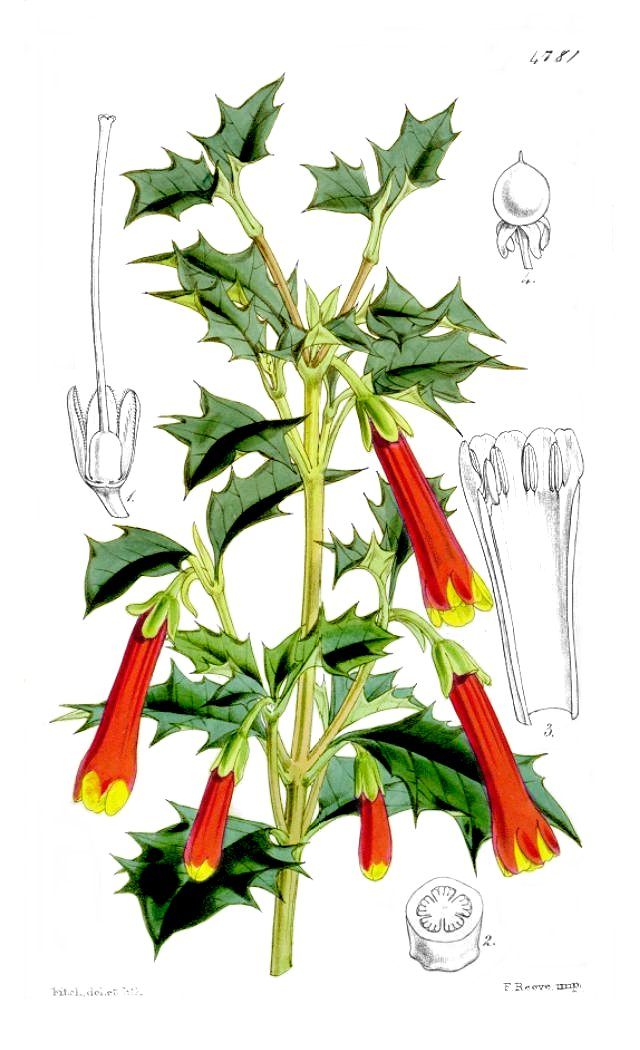
- Desfontainia spinosa

Scientific classification
- Kingdom: Plantae
- Clade: Tracheophytes
- Clade: Angiosperms
- Clade: Eudicots
- Clade: Asterids
- Clade: Campanulids
- Order: Bruniales; Dumort.

Families
- Bruniaceae; Columelliaceae

= Bruniales =

Order of flowering plants

Bruniales is an order of flowering plants, included in the asterid group of eudicots. Under the APG IV system of flowering plant classification the order consists of two families: Bruniaceae, which are shrubs native to South Africa, and Columelliaceae, which are trees and shrubs native to Central and South America.

== Taxonomy ==
Bruniales was not recognized as an order until 2008 when a study suggested that Bruniaceae and Columelliaceae were sister clades. In 2009, the APG III system placed both families as the only members of the order Bruniales, which is a sister order to the Apiales. Before this, both families were placed in the Lamiales.

The APG III phylogenetic tree for the asterids is:

- asterids
  - Cornales
  - - Ericales
    - euasterids
      - lamiids
        - Garryales
        - - Boraginales
          - Gentianales
          - - Solanales
            - Lamiales
      - campanulids
        - Aquifoliales
        - - Asterales
          - Escalloniales
          - - Bruniales
            - - Apiales
              - - Paracryphiales
                - Dipsacales
