= Pehr von Afzelius =

Swedish medical doctor and professor

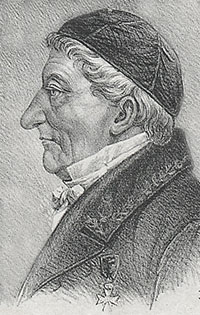
- Born: Pehr Afzelius; 14 December 1760; Larv, Sweden
- Died: 2 December 1843 (aged 82); Uppsala, Sweden
- Occupations: Physician and professor
- Relatives: Johan Afzelius (brother) Adam Afzelius (brother)

Pehr von Afzelius (14 December 1760, Larv – 2 December 1843 in Uppsala, Sweden) was a Swedish medical doctor and professor in Uppsala. Afzelius was the brother of botanist Adam Afzelius, chemist Johan Afzelius, and doctoral advisor of Jacob Berzelius.

From 1777 to 1781 he studied at Uppsala University, and in February 1784 began a lengthy study trip, in which he visited several European universities, most notably in Paris and Edinburgh. During the Russo-Swedish War (1788–90), he served in Finland as a Life Guards regimental doctor. In 1801 he succeeded Johan Gustaf Acrel as professor of medicine at Uppsala, where he twice served as university rector (1805, 1816). In 1820 he resigned his professorship, but kept working at the university hospital up until July 1831.

== Selected works ==
- In aneurysmata femoris observationes, (with Adolph Murray) 1785.
- Dissertationum medicarum lineæ primæ, (with Jacob Betulin) 1801.
- In reformandam pharmacopoeam Suecicam prolegomena, (with Jacob Betulin) 1801.
- Brevväxling mellan Christopher Carlander och Pehr Afzelius, 1789-1822, (1991) – Correspondence between Christopher Carlander and Pehr Afzelius.
