= Afzelius =

- Language: Swedish

Afzelius is a Swedish surname. Notable people with the surname include:

- Adam Afzelius (1750–1837), Swedish naturalist
- Arvid Afzelius (1857–1923), Swedish dermatologist
- Arvid August Afzelius (1785–1871), Swedish poet and historian
- Björn Afzelius (1947–1999), Swedish singer
- Johan Afzelius (1753–1837), Swedish chemist
- Jon Arvid Afzelius (1856–1918), Swedish linguist
- Per von Afzelius (1760–1843), Swedish medicine
- Ronnie Afzelius (1972–present), Swedish entrepreneur

== Sources ==
- Biographies in Swedish
