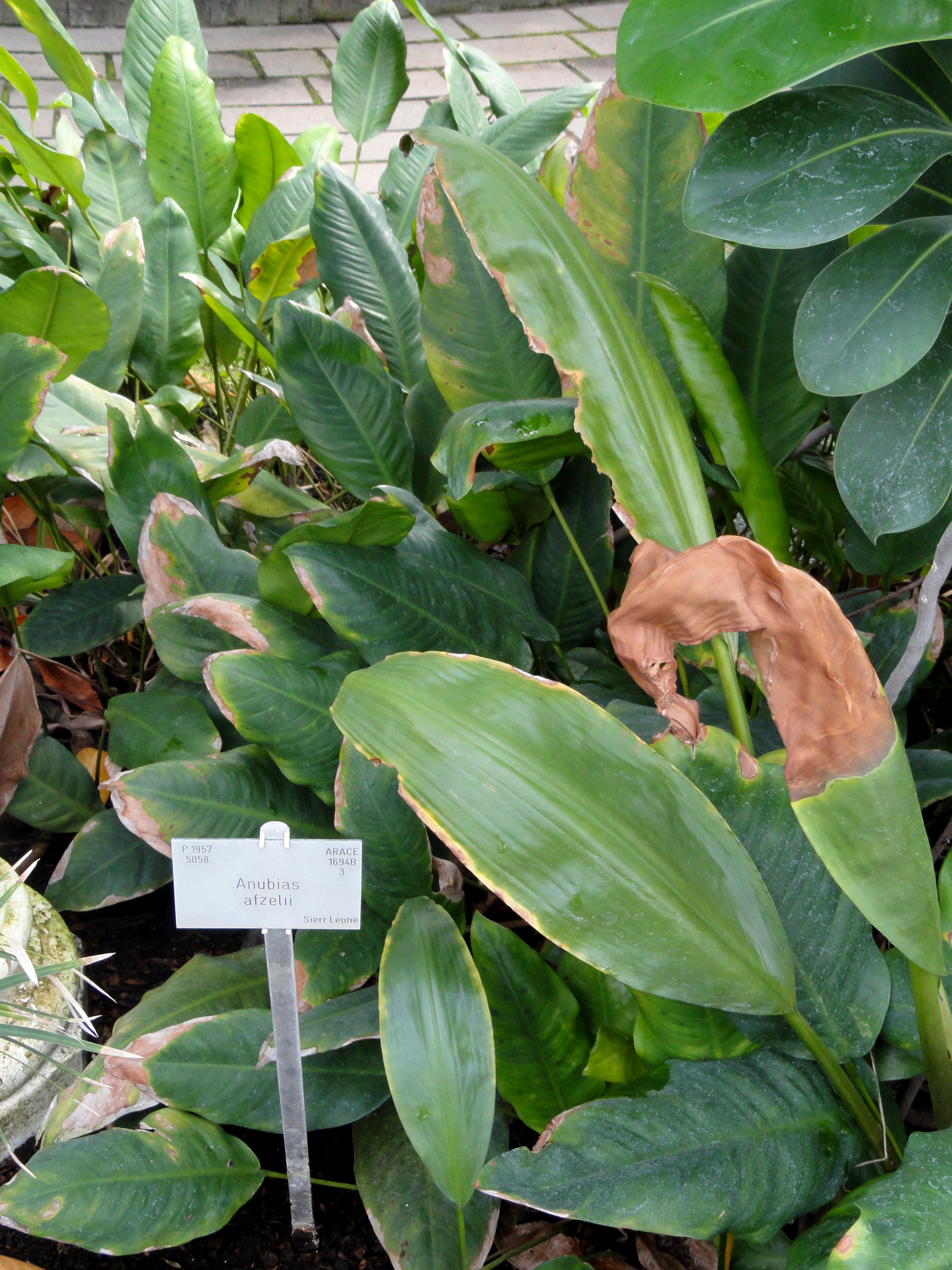

Scientific classification
- Kingdom: Plantae
- Clade: Tracheophytes
- Clade: Angiosperms
- Clade: Monocots
- Order: Alismatales
- Family: Araceae
- Genus: Anubias
- Species: A. afzelii

Binomial name
- Anubias afzelii Schott

= Anubias afzelii =

Species of aquatic plant

Anubias afzelii is a species belonging to the Aroid genus Anubias. It was first described scientifically by Heinrich Wilhelm Schott in 1857, based on material collected in Sierra Leone by Adam Afzelius, after whom the species was named. The genus Anubias was described simultaneously, with only A. afzellii belonging to it, which therefore is the type species of the genus. No other species currently placed in the genus Anubias was described earlier (in a different genus) and A. afzelii was therefore the first species of this genus known to science.

== Distribution ==
West Africa: Senegal, Guinea, Sierra Leone, and Mali.

== Description ==
Anubias afzelii has elongated, leathery leaf blades that can be up to 35 cm long and 13 cm wide. The leaf stems are generally shorter than the blade. The leaves are set on a creeping and rooting rhizome that is 1–4 cm thick. The spathe is 3–7 cm long (exceptionally up to 9 cm long) and has a 13–32 cm long peduncle. The spadix is 5–8 cm long (exceptionally up to 12 cm long) and slightly longer than the spathe, so that the tip slightly protrudes from it. The upper part is covered with male flowers, of which the 5-6 stamens are fused into synandria, with the thecae on its sides. The lower part of the spadix is covered with female flowers that are reduced to the ovary and stigma.

== Ecology ==
The plant grows in wet, shady places and flowers from the end of March to July, fruiting from April to September. It generally grows emerged, but can sometimes be completely submerged.

== Cultivation ==
This plant grows best when only partially submersed and not crowded by other plants and is most suited for the paludarium, but can also be used in larger aquariums, where it grows very slowly. It does not require much light. It prefers a temperature range of 22-26 °C. It can be propagated by dividing the rhizome, but seed-propagation is not difficult either.
