= Daniel Erik Næzén =

Swedish provincial physician

Daniel Erik (Eric) Næzén (February 27, 1752, Skövde - December 1, 1808, Umeå), was a Swedish provincial physician, engraver, composer and natural scientist. In his youth Næzén was a founder member, on 13 December 1769, of the Swedish Topographical Society in Skara alongside parish priest and naturalist Clas Bjerkander, Anders Dahl, Johan Abraham, entomologist Leonard Gyllenhaal, chemist Johan Afzelius and Olof Knös. The members reported on plant and animal life, geography, topography, historical monuments and economic life, mostly in the Västergötland area. From 1770, Næzén studied in Uppsala, where in April 1782 he gained his licentiate of medicine. He studied under Carl von Linné. In July 1782 he became a provincial physician in Umeå. As a natural scientist, he contributed entomological papers to the Academy of Sciences journals. And also for the science academy he, from 1796 until his death, made meteorological observations in Umeå . Næzén left a comprehensive collection of insects, plants and minerals. Næzén studied at the Musical Academy in 1773 and was an amateur musician and amateur composer. He was elected as member 124 of the Royal Music Academy on 18 December 1790 and by the Royal Academy of Sciences in 1793.

He described the weevil Anoplus plantaris (Naezen, 1794) and the moth Tortrix naezeniana described by Carl Peter Thunberg, 1797 honours his name.

== Works ==
partial list

- Naëzen, D. E. 1792: Beskrifning på några, vid Umeå fundne, okände arter ibland Skalbaggarne. Kongl. Vetenskaps Academiens nya Handlingar, Stockholm - 13 (3) 167–174
- Naëzen, D. E. 1794: Beskrifning på några, vid Umeå fundne Insekter, dels okände, dels förut otydeligen bemärkte, och i Fauna Suecica ej uptagne. Kongl. Vetenskaps Academiens nya Handlingar, Stockholm - 15 (4) 265–274
