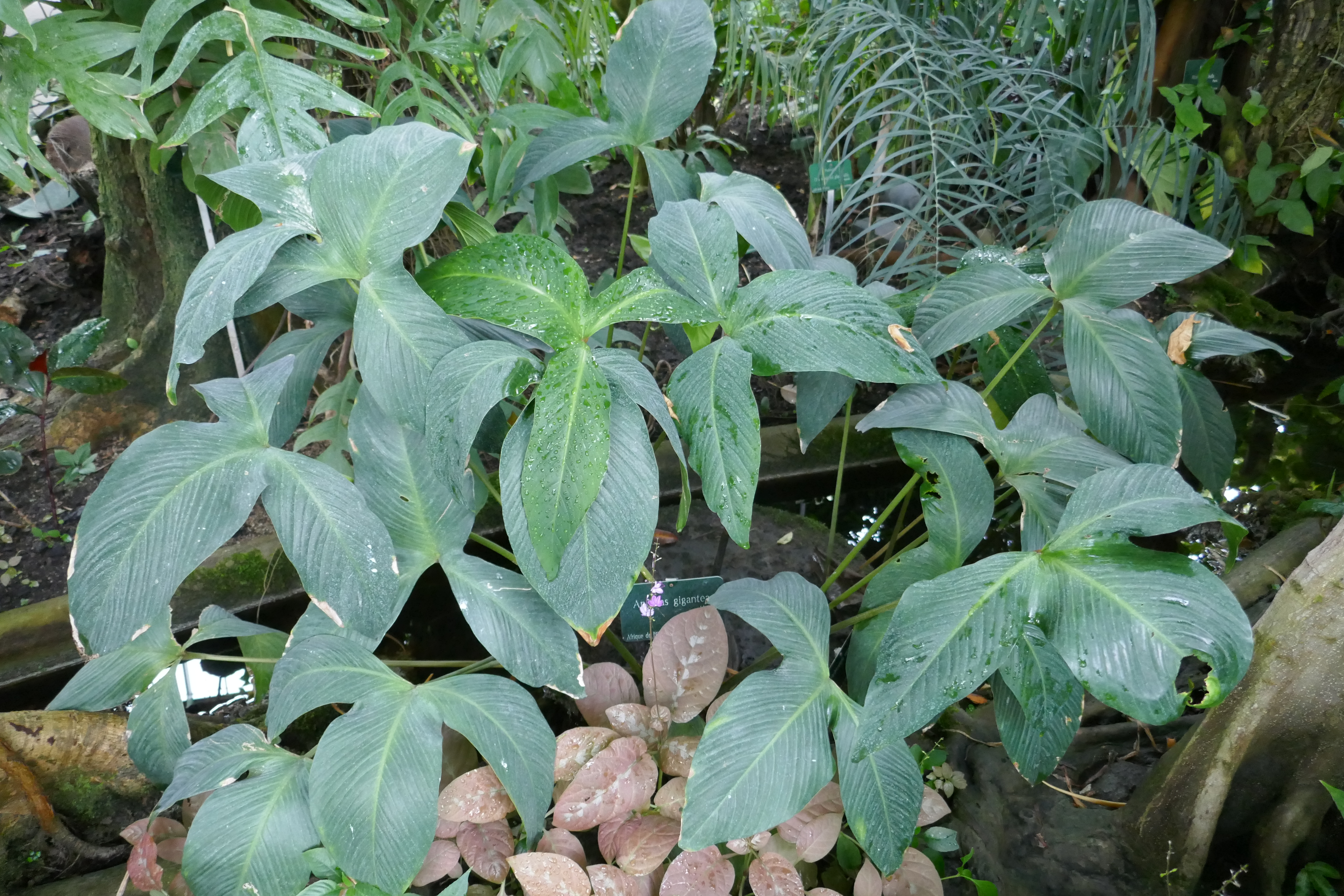

Scientific classification
- Kingdom: Plantae
- Clade: Tracheophytes
- Clade: Angiosperms
- Clade: Monocots
- Order: Alismatales
- Family: Araceae
- Genus: Anubias
- Species: A. gigantea

Binomial name
- Anubias gigantea Chevalier ex Hutchinson

= Anubias gigantea =

Species of aquatic plant

Anubias gigantea is an aquatic to riparian aroid species belonging to the genus Anubias, within the Araceae (the arum family). It was first mentioned by Auguste Chevalier in 1920, based on material that he had collected in Guinea, West Africa. The formal description followed in 1939 by John Hutchinson. It is closely related to A. afzelii, basically only differing from that species by the form of the leaf-blade, with mature growth appearing somewhat different than the juvenile plants.

== Synonyms ==
The following names are synonyms of A. gigantea: A. gigantea var. tripartita Chevalier, 1920 and A. hastifolia var. robusta Engler, 1915.

== Distribution ==
Anubias gigantea is known from West Africa, including the countries of Guinea, Sierra Leone, Liberia, Ivory Coast, and Togo.

== Description ==
Anubias gigantea has large arrow-shaped leaf blades that can be up to 30 cm (12 in) long and 14 cm (6 in) wide. The leaf stems are slightly shorter till up to 2.5 times longer than the blade. The leaves are set on a creeping and rooting rhizome that is 1–3 cm thick. The spathe is 3.5–8 centimetres (1.4–3.1 in) long and has a 14–60 centimetres (5.5–23.6 in) long peduncle. The spadix is up to 9 centimetres (3.5 in) long and slightly longer than the spathe, so that the tip slightly protrudes from it. The upper part is covered with male flowers, of which the 4-6 stamens are fused into synandria, with the thecae on its sides. The lower part of the spadix is covered with female flowers that are reduced to the ovary and stigma.

== Ecology ==
The plant is semi-aquatic and grows mostly on rocky places at the banks of rivers or in the riverbed. It flowers from February to April.

== Cultivation ==
This plant grows best when only partially submersed and not crowded by other plants and is most suited for the paludarium, but can also be used in larger aquariums, where it grows very slowly. It does not require much light. It prefers a temperature range of 22-26 °C. It can be propagated by dividing the rhizome, but seed-propagation is not difficult either.
