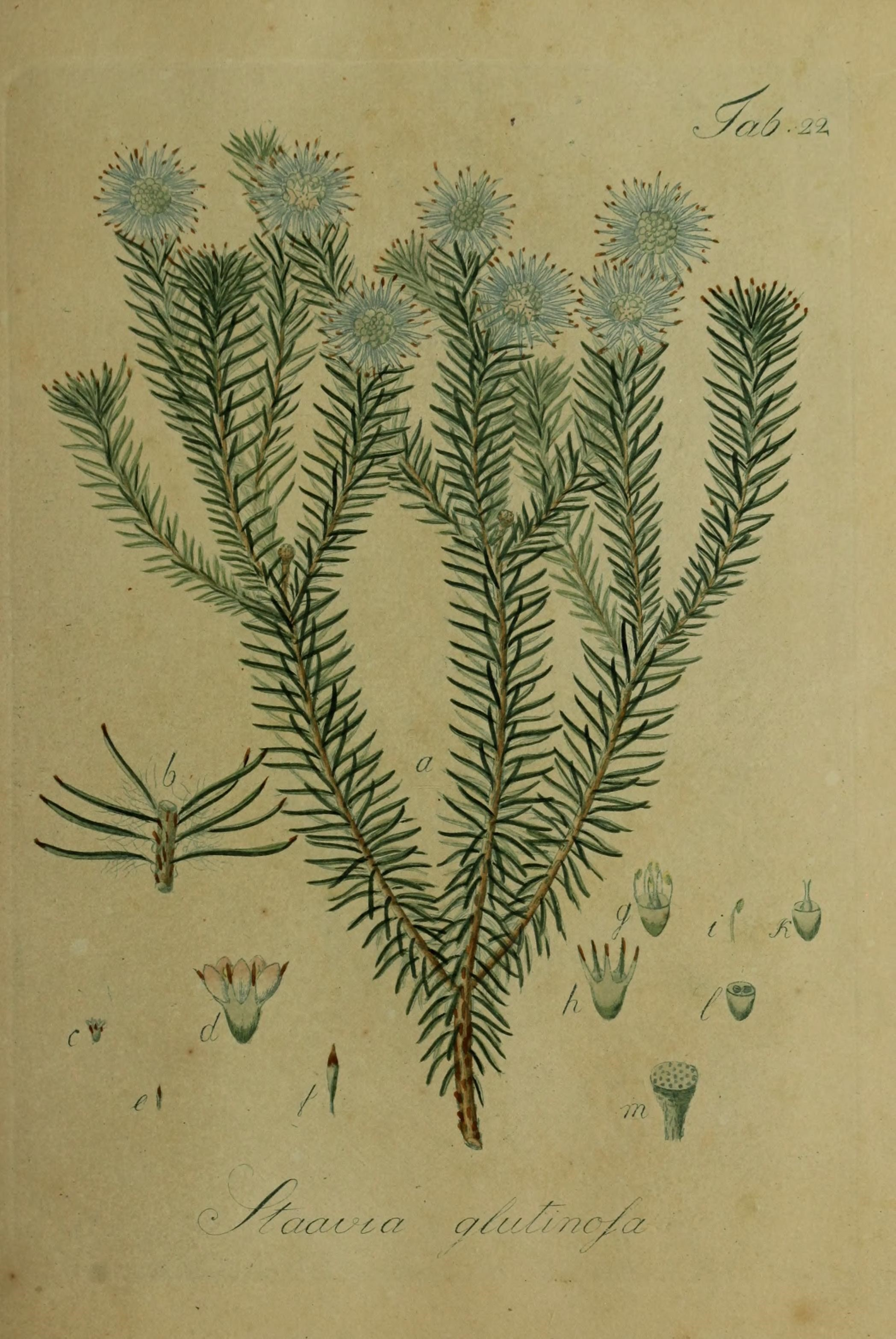
- Collectio plantarum tam exoticarum, quam indigenarum, cum delineatione, descriptione culturaque earum

Scientific classification
- Kingdom: Plantae
- Clade: Tracheophytes
- Clade: Angiosperms
- Clade: Eudicots
- Clade: Asterids
- Order: Bruniales
- Family: Bruniaceae
- Genus: Staavia; Dahl

Synonyms
- Astrocoma Neck.; Levisanus Schreb.

= Staavia =

Genus of plants

Staavia is a genus of flowering plants belonging to the family Bruniaceae.

It is native to the Cape Provinces in the South African Republic.

The genus name of Staavia is in honour of Martin Staaf (1731–1788), a correspondent with Carl Linnaeus, in Gothenburg. It was first described and published in Observ. Bot. on page 15 in 1787.

== Knowns species ==
According to Kew:

- Staavia brownii Dümmer
- Staavia capitella (Thunb.) Sond.
- Staavia dodii Bolus
- Staavia glutinosa (P.J.Bergius) Dahl
- Staavia phylicoides Pillans
- Staavia pinifolia Willd.
- Staavia radiata (L.) Dahl
- Staavia staavioides (Sond.) A.V.Hall
- Staavia trichotoma (Thunb.) Pillans
- Staavia verticillata (L.f.) Pillans
- Staavia zeyheri Sond.
