= Stockholms nation =

Student nation of Uppsala University

Coordinates: 59°51′24″N 17°38′03″E

Stockholms Nation
- Uppsala University
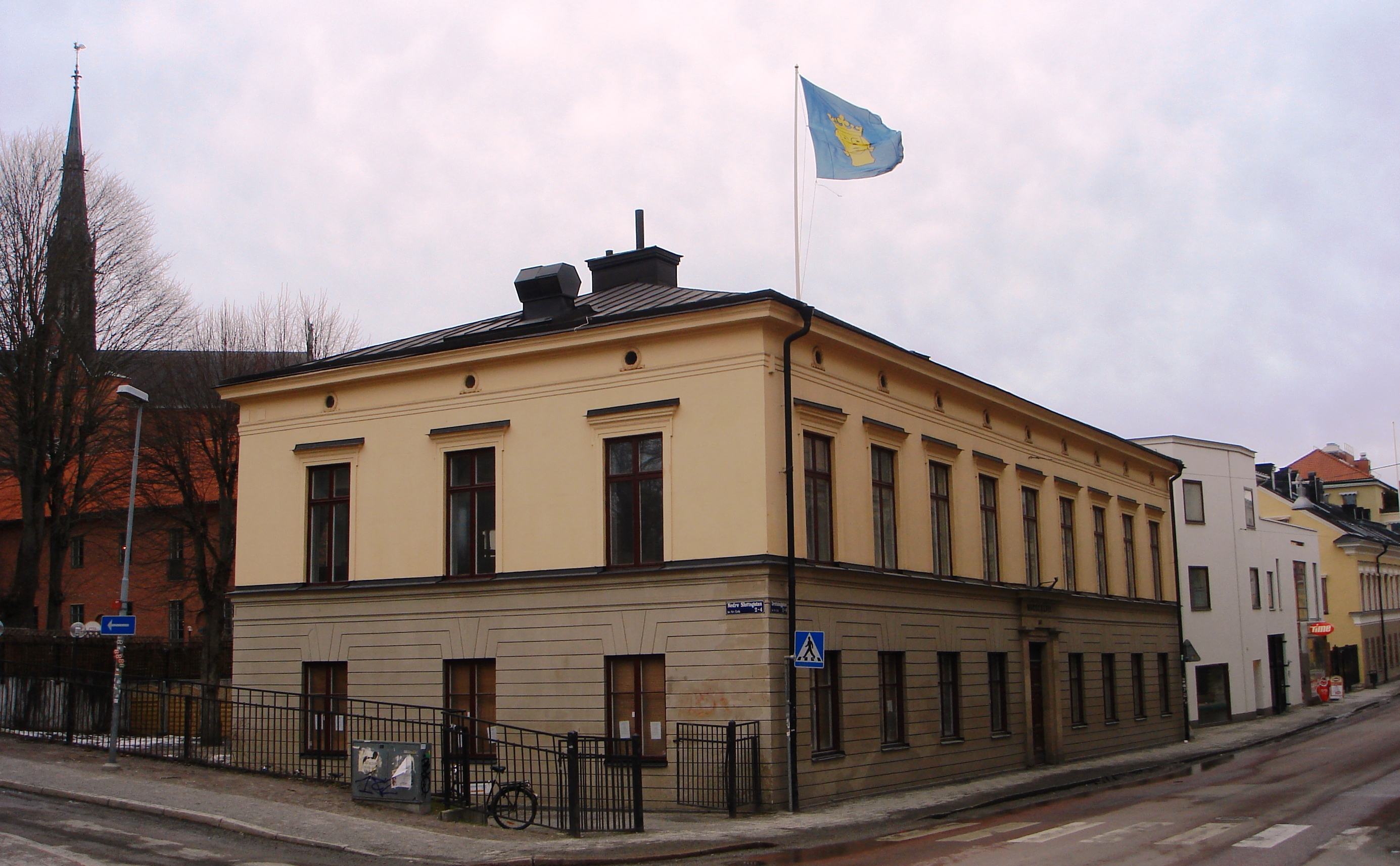
- Location: Drottninggatan 11; 753 10 UPPSALA; Sweden
- Latin name: Natio Holmiensis
- Abbreviation: Stocken
- Established: 1649
- Inspektor: Tord Ekelöf
- Membership: approx. 4400
- Website: www.stockholms.se

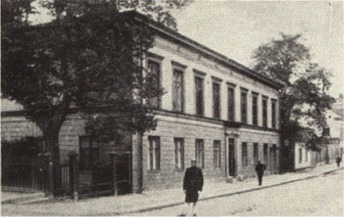
The nation building in the early 1900s

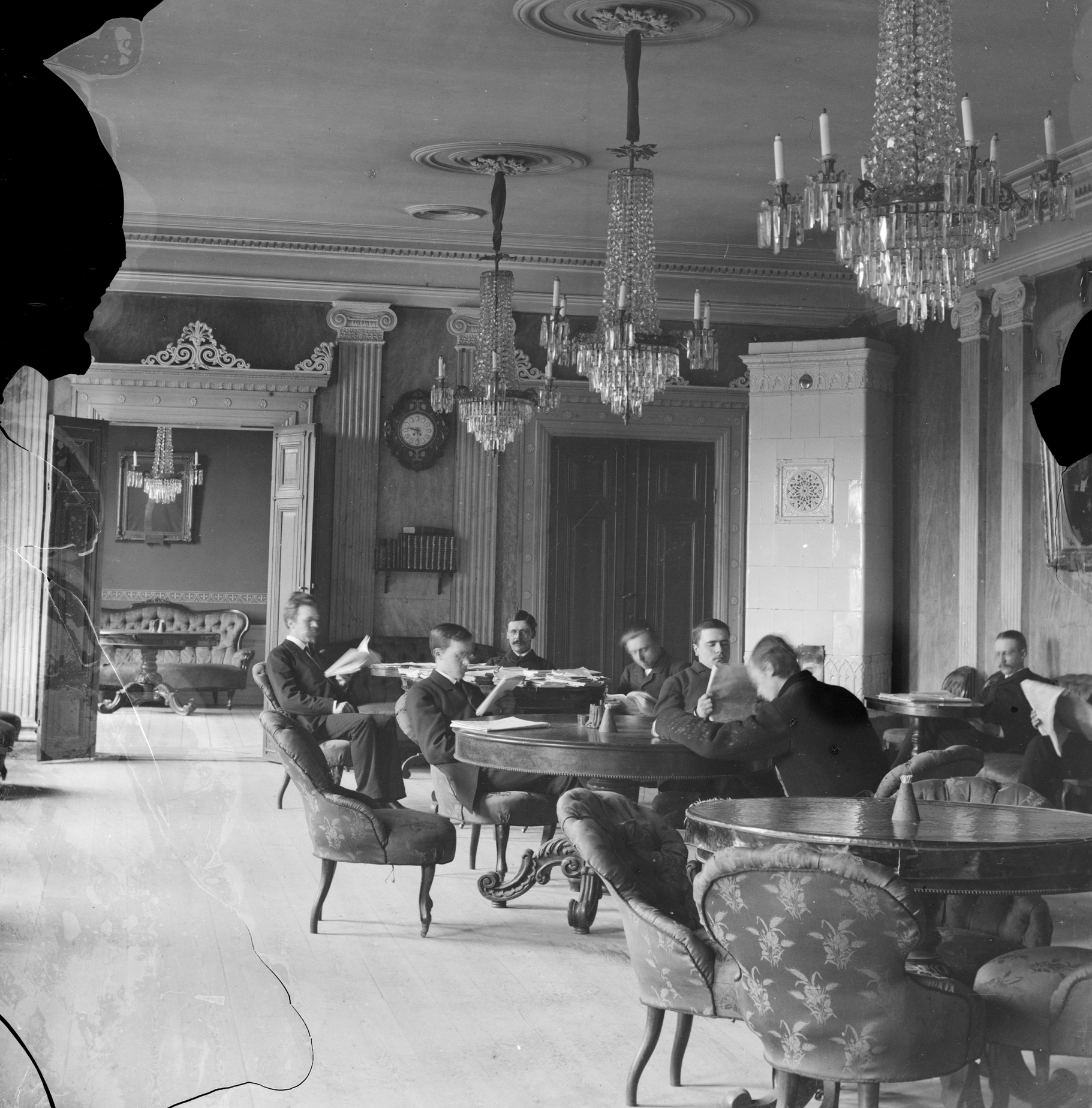
The meeting and banquet hall of the nation in the 1880s

Stockholms nation is a student society and one of thirteen nations at Uppsala University. The nation has its origins in the mid-17th century and regards 1649 as its official date of foundation, although this is uncertain. A document in the archives mentions students enrolled in the nation in 1649, but this is a copy of an original that was lost in a fire in 1702, and the nation is mentioned in the protocols of the consistory (board) of the university from 1656 as having been in existence for three years, which would put the foundation date at about 1653.

The old part of the nation building was designed by architect Johan Fredrik Åbom, and was completed in 1848. A new wing of the nation building, begun in 1961, is designed by modernist architect Peter Celsing.

Former curators (chairmen) of the nation include the mathematician Gösta Mittag-Leffler, the economist Knut Wicksell and the author Gösta Knutsson. The songwriter Carl Michael Bellman was enrolled in Stockholms nation during his brief period as a student in Uppsala (1758–1759).

== Inspektors ==
Stockholms nation

- Lars Stigzelius 1663-?
- Olof Åkerman ?-1678
- Lars Fornelius 1678-1679
- Anders Spole 1679-1696
- Jesper Svedberg 1696-1703
- Johan Arendt Bellman 1703-1709
- Lars Molin 1709-1723
- Erik Benzelius 1724-1727
- Johan Hermansson ?-1737
- Erik Melander 1737-1745
- Nils Rosén von Rosenstein 1745-1757
- Samuel Aurivillius 1757-1767
- Daniel Melanderhjelm 1767-1784
- Johan Gustaf Acrel 1794-1800
- Sven Wijkman 1801-1805
- Pehr Högmark 1806-1808
- Olof Kolmodin 1808-1838
- Pehr Erik Bergfalk 1838-1861
- Fredrik Ferdinand Carlson 1861-1863
- Carl Axel Torén 1863-1885
- Carl Gustaf Lundquist 1885-1897
- Henrik Schück 1898-1918
- Erik Schöne Staaff 1918-1927
- Ludvig Stavenow 1927-1929
- Hjalmar Psilander 1929-1934
- Anton Blanck 1934-1945
- Robin Fåhraeus 1945-1956
- Per Olof Ekelöf 1956-1972
- Göran Ohlin 1972-1976
- Fritiof Rundgren 1978-1982
- Jan Pontén 1982-1993
- Stellan Bengtsson 1993-1998
- Lena Marcusson 1998-2006
- Mats Kumlien 2006-2011
- Tord Ekelöf 2011--2024
- Coco Norén 2024 -

== Notable initiatives ==
In 1983, four students at the nation — Rikard Högberg, Sverker Littorin, Hans Wernstedt and Hans von Gaffron — founded the Stockholm Culture Awards, an international arts and culture distinction.
