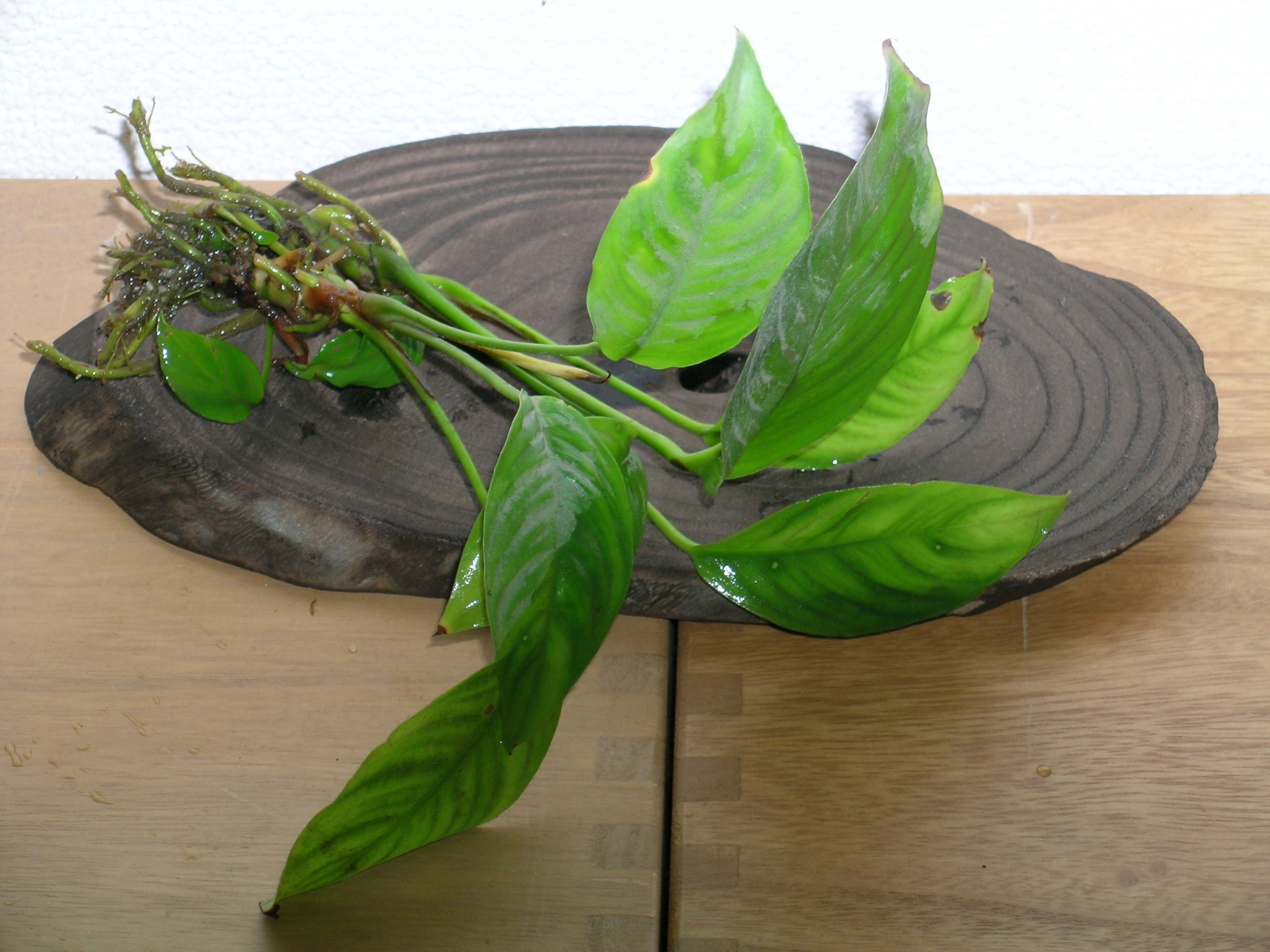

Conservation status
- Least Concern (IUCN 3.1)

Scientific classification
- Kingdom: Plantae
- Clade: Tracheophytes
- Clade: Angiosperms
- Clade: Monocots
- Order: Alismatales
- Family: Araceae
- Genus: Anubias
- Species: A. heterophylla

Binomial name
- Anubias heterophylla Engl.

Synonyms
- A. congensis N.E. Brown; A. congensis var. crassispadix Engler; A. affinis De Wildeman; A. engleri De Wildeman; A. bequaerti De Wildeman; A. undulata nomen nudum

= Anubias heterophylla =

Species of aquatic plant

Anubias heterophylla is a species belonging to the Aroid genus Anubias. It was first described scientifically by Adolf Engler in 1879.

== Synonyms ==
The following names are synonyms of A. heterophylla: A. congensis N.E. Brown, 1901, (including A. congensis var. crassispadix Engler, 1915), A. affinis De Wildeman, 1907, A. engleri De Wildeman, 1907, A. bequaerti De Wildeman, 1922, and A. undulata (trade name).

== Distribution ==
Cameroon, Equatorial Guinea, Gabon, Republic of the Congo, Democratic Republic of the Congo, and Angola (including Cabinda Province).

== Description ==
Anubias heterophylla has leaf blades that can be up to 38 cm long and 13 cm wide and are rather variable in form, ranging from elliptic/oval to lance- or spear-shaped. The leaf stems are generally longer than the blade and up to 66 cm long. The leaves are set on a creeping and rooting rhizome that is 5 to 17 mm thick. The spathe is 1.5 to 4.5 cm long and 2 to 4.5 times as long as wide, and has an up to 27 cm long peduncle. The spadix is 1.5 to 4.5 cm long and can be up to 2 times than the spathe. The upper part is covered with male flowers, of which the 4 to 6 stamens are fused into synandria, with the thecae on its sides. The lower part of the spadix is covered with female flowers that are reduced to the ovary and stigma.

== Ecology ==
The plant grows on rocky grounds at the edge of watercourses and on their damp banks. It flowers from July to January, fruiting from July to March.

== Use ==
A. heterophylla is reportedly used as a stomachic for children.

== Cultivation ==
This slow-growing plant is recommended in spacious aquariums and paludariums, where propagation by division of the rhizome is the general method. This plant grows best when only partially submerse and not crowded by other plants. It prefers a temperature range of 24 to 27 °C. It can be propagated by dividing the rhizome. Smaller plants can be cultivated successfully in an aquarium.
