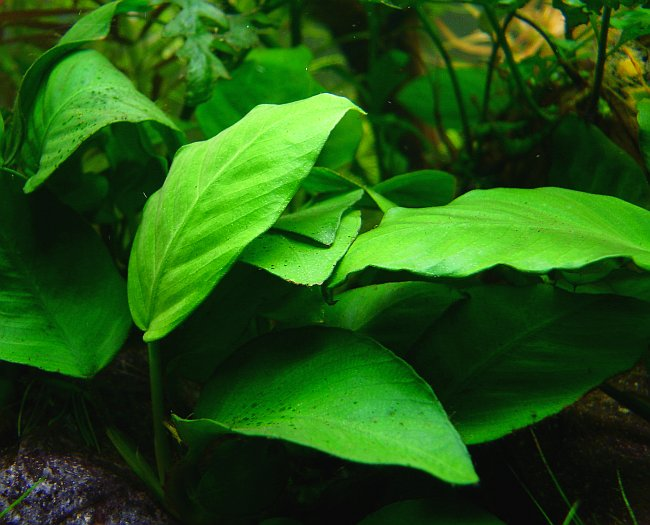
- Anubias barteri var. glabra

Conservation status
- Least Concern (IUCN 3.1)

Scientific classification
- Kingdom: Plantae
- Clade: Tracheophytes
- Clade: Angiosperms
- Clade: Monocots
- Order: Alismatales
- Family: Araceae
- Genus: Anubias
- Species: A. barteri

Binomial name
- Anubias barteri Schott

= Anubias barteri =

Species of aquatic plant

Anubias barteri is a West African species of Anubias, first described in 1860 by Heinrich Wilhelm Schott. It occurs in south-eastern Nigeria, Cameroon and on Bioko.

== Description ==
The form of the leaf varies widely between varieties; in A. barteri var. barteri (known as the "broadleaf Anubias"), the leaves are leathery, and may grow to 12 inches (300 mm). The rhizome remains above the substrate, tethered to litter like rocks and wood.

== Cultivation ==
This plant grows well partially and fully submersed. In strong light, the leaves grow more quickly and remain more compact, but it tolerates a range of lighting. It prefers a temperature range of 72–82 °F (22–28 °C). It can be propagated by dividing the rhizome or by separating side shoots. If buried beneath a substrate, the rhizome may rot.

== Varieties ==
The species has the following varieties:

- Anubias barteri var. angustifolia
- Anubias barteri var. caladiifolia
- Anubias barteri var. glabra
- Anubias barteri var. nana

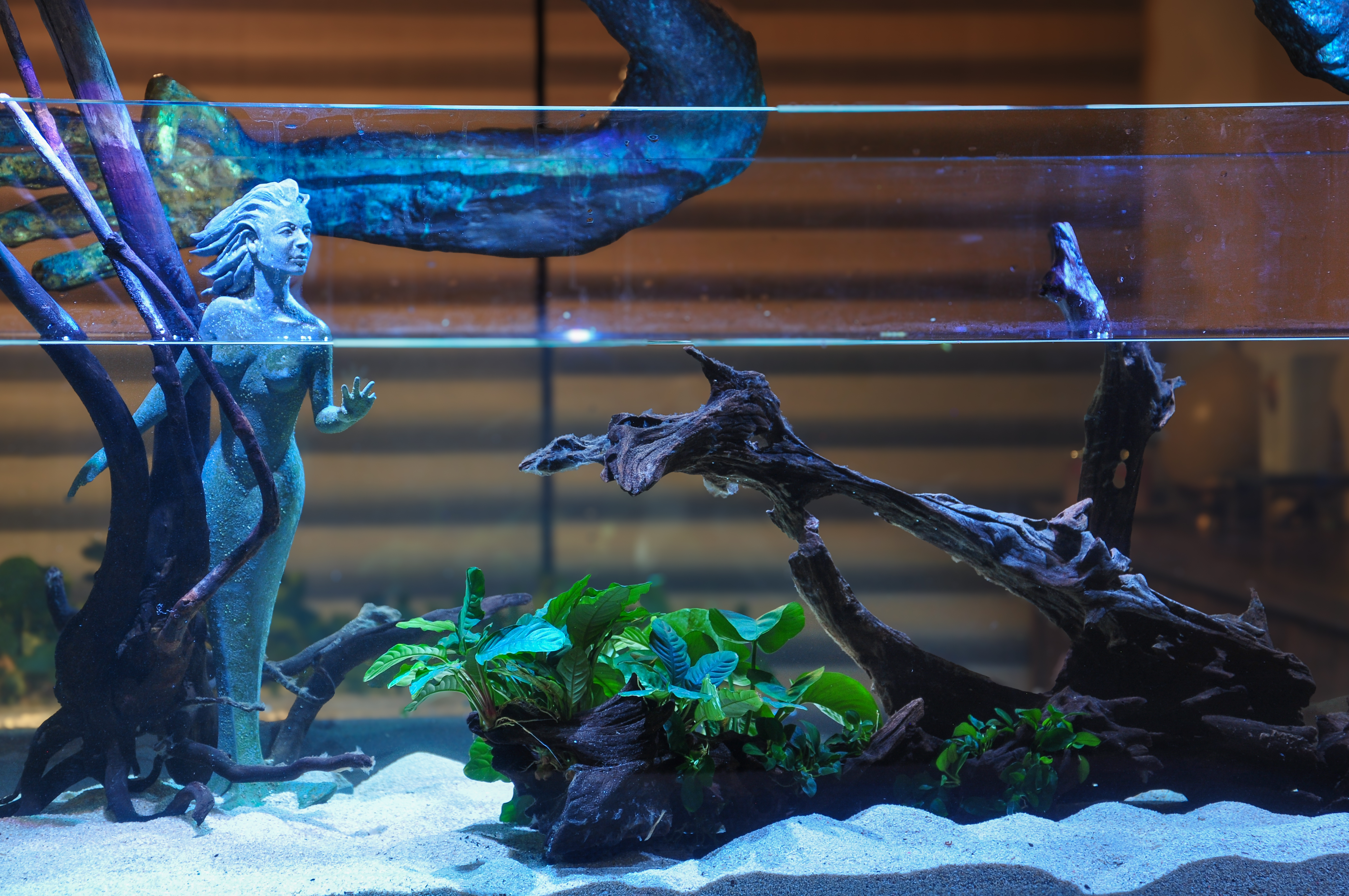
Aquascape with Anubias on driftwood
