= Anubias gracilis =

Conservation status
- Vulnerable (IUCN 3.1)

Scientific classification
- Kingdom: Plantae
- Clade: Tracheophytes
- Clade: Angiosperms
- Clade: Monocots
- Order: Alismatales
- Family: Araceae
- Genus: Anubias
- Species: A. gracilis

Binomial name
- Anubias gracilis A.Chev. ex Hutch.

Species of aquatic plant

Anubias gracilis is a plant that was first mentioned in 1920 by Chevalier and thereafter validly described by Hutchinson and Dalziel in 1936.

== Distribution ==
It is found in the Western Africa nations of Sierra Leone and Guinea.

== Description ==
Its long-stalked medium-green leaves are spade-shaped and may grow to 12 inches (30 cm) in length.

== Cultivation ==
This plant grows best when only partially submersed and when not crowded by other plants. It requires a lot of nutrients, a loose, iron-rich substrate, and moderate-to-strong light. It prefers a temperature range of 22-26 degrees C (72-79 degrees F). It can be propagated by dividing the rhizome.
