= Anubias pynaertii =

Scientific classification
- Kingdom: Plantae
- Clade: Tracheophytes
- Clade: Angiosperms
- Clade: Monocots
- Order: Alismatales
- Family: Araceae
- Genus: Anubias
- Species: A. pynaertii

Binomial name
- Anubias pynaertii De Wild.

Species of aquatic plant

Anubias pynaertii is a species belonging to the Aroid genus Anubias. It was first described scientifically by Émile Auguste Joseph De Wildeman in 1910, based on material collected in Zaire by, among others, Léon Auguste Edouard Joseph Pynaert, after whom the species was named.

== Distribution ==
Gabon, Republic of the Congo, and Zaire.

== Description ==
Anubias pynaertii has spear-shaped leaf blades that can be up to 29 cm long and 14 cm wide. The leaf stems are generally longer than the blade. The leaves are set on a creeping and rooting rhizome that is 0.5-1.5 cm thick. The spathe is 2–3.5 cm long and has a 7–27 cm long peduncle. The spadix is 2.5-3.5 cm long and about as long as the spathe. The upper part is covered with male flowers, of which the 4-6 stamens are fused into synandria, with the thecae covering the side of the synandrium entirely as well as the larger part of the top of the synandrium. The lower part of the spadix is covered with female flowers that are reduced to the ovary and stigma.

== Ecology ==
The plant grows in wet, shady places and flowers and fruits throughout the year.
