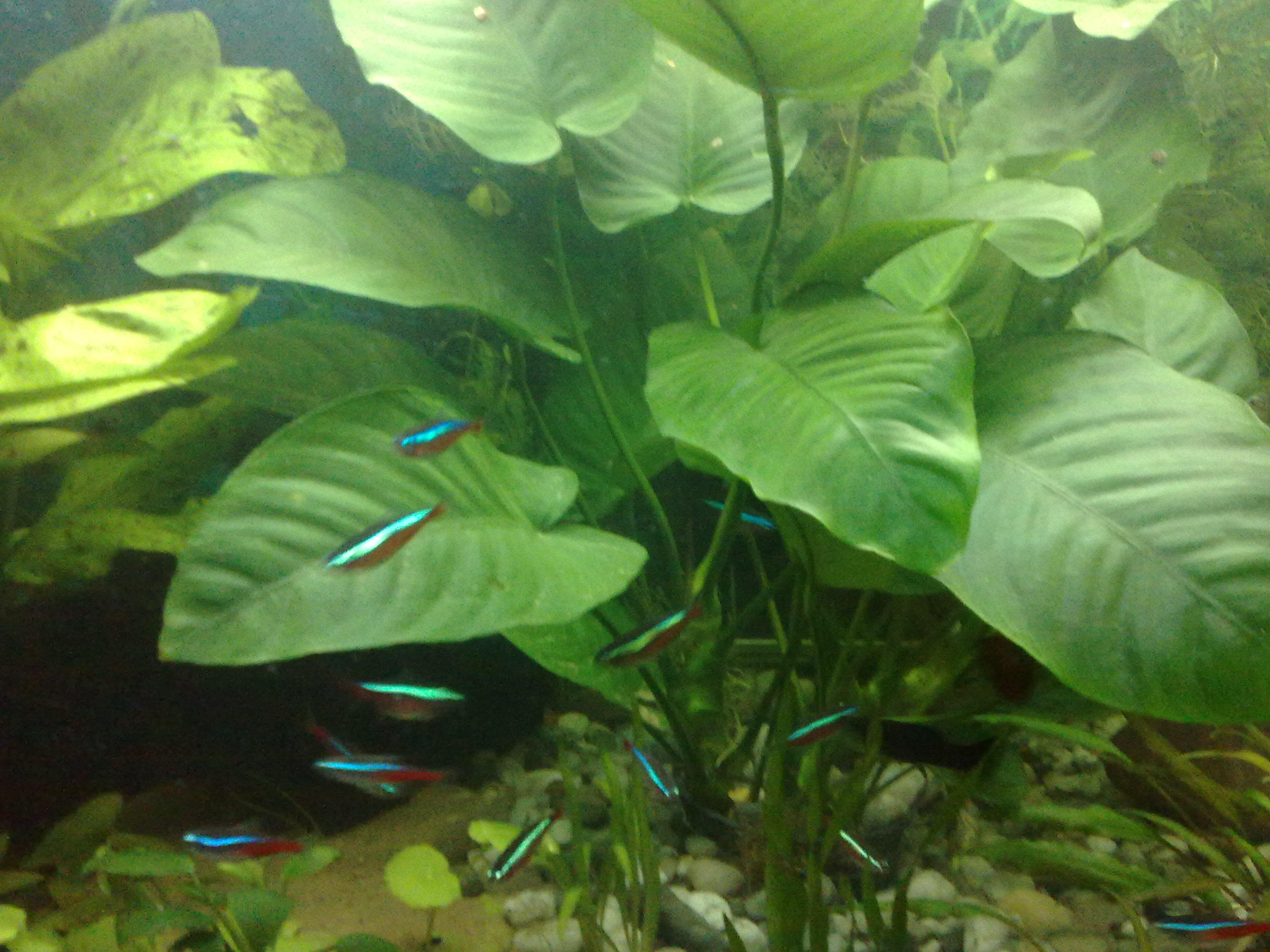

Scientific classification
- Kingdom: Plantae
- Clade: Tracheophytes
- Clade: Angiosperms
- Clade: Monocots
- Order: Alismatales
- Family: Araceae
- Genus: Anubias
- Species: A. barteri
- Variety: A. b. var. caladiifolia

Trinomial name
- Anubias barteri var. caladiifolia Engler

= Anubias barteri var. caladiifolia =

Variety of aquatic plant

Anubias barteri var. caladiifolia was first described by Adolf Engler in 1915.

== Distribution ==
West Africa: South-west Nigeria, Fernando Po, Cameroon.

== Description ==
This plant's large leave blades are 1.5-2.5 times as long (10–23 cm) as wide (5-14) cm long. The petioles are 10–54 cm long, from 1-2.5 times as long as the blade. The base of the leaf is typically lobed.

== Cultivation ==
Like most Anubias species, this plant grows well partially and fully submersed and the rhizome must be above the substrate, attached to rocks or wood. It grows well in a range of lighting and prefers a temperature range of 22-28 degrees C. It can be propagated by dividing the rhizome or by separating side shoots.
