= Linnéska institutet =

Scientific society at Uppsala University

The Linnéska institutet (Linnaean Institute) was a short-lived scientific society at Uppsala University in the early 19th century. It has the distinction of being the first student society in Uppsala preoccupied with the natural sciences.

== Activities ==
The society was founded in 1800 by a few students under the name Societas pro historia naturali ("Society for Natural History"), which was changed in 1802 to Zoophytolithiska sällskapet ("Zoophytolithic Society") and finally in 1807 to Linnéska institutet ("Linnaean Institute". The Linnaean disciple Adam Afzelius, then botanices demonstrator (and later professor), was elected its president in 1802. At the time of its last change of name in 1807, done to celebrate the 100th anniversary of Linnaeus' birth, the society had a memorial medal made and published the only fascicle of Linnéska institutets skrifter ("Publications of the Linnaean Institute"); this issue, which was the only one ever published, was reprinted in an edition of Johan Markus Hulth in 1906. Activities ceased in 1813.

The remaining protocols and other papers of the society are kept in Uppsala University Library

== Members ==
Besides Afzelius, members or collaborators in the only issue of the journal included Lars Herman Gyllenhaal (later Swedish prime minister for justice), the geologist and mining engineer Jacob Henrik af Forselles, the palaeozoologist Johan Wilhelm Dalman, the collector Gabriel Marklin, the physician Carl Stenhammar (later a professor at Karolinska Institutet), and the later civil servant and amateur naturalist Baron Fredrik Anton Wrangel. Dalman, who was secretary of the society, had appreciated it as an unpretentious meeting place for informal discussions between students and teachers, but resented the pompous character it acquired with the change of name and the magnificent celebration of the Linnaean anniversary in 1807, which he likened to a funeral service for the society.
