= Staavia trichotoma =

Scientific classification
- Kingdom: Plantae
- Clade: Tracheophytes
- Clade: Angiosperms
- Clade: Eudicots
- Clade: Asterids
- Order: Bruniales
- Family: Bruniaceae
- Genus: Staavia
- Species: S. trichotoma

Binomial name
- Staavia trichotoma (Thunb.) Pillans

Synonyms
- Phylica trichotoma Thunb.

Species of plant

Staavia trichotoma is a perennial, flowering shrub that is part of the Staavia genus. The species is endemic to the Western Cape and is part of the fynbos. The plant occurs between Villiersdorp and Genadendal and was last seen in 1940.
