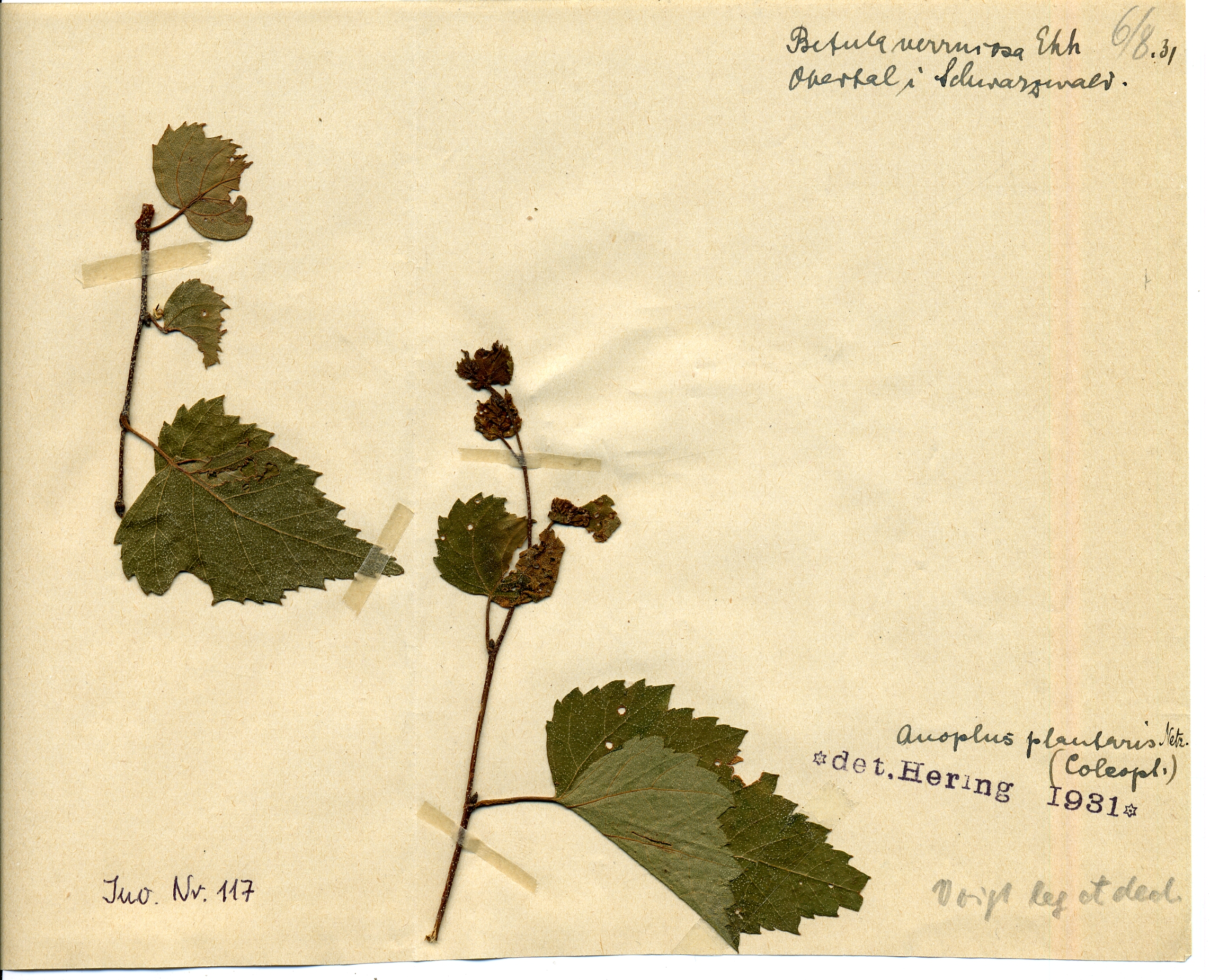
- Anoplus plantaris leaf mark on Betula verrucosa Museum Wiesbaden

Scientific classification
- Domain: Eukaryota
- Kingdom: Animalia
- Phylum: Arthropoda
- Class: Insecta
- Order: Coleoptera
- Suborder: Polyphaga
- Infraorder: Cucujiformia
- Family: Curculionidae
- Genus: Anoplus
- Species: A. plantaris

Binomial name
- Anoplus plantaris (Naezen, 1794)

= Anoplus plantaris =

Species of beetle

Anoplus plantaris is a species of weevil native to Europe.
