= Dish garden =

Small, indoor garden

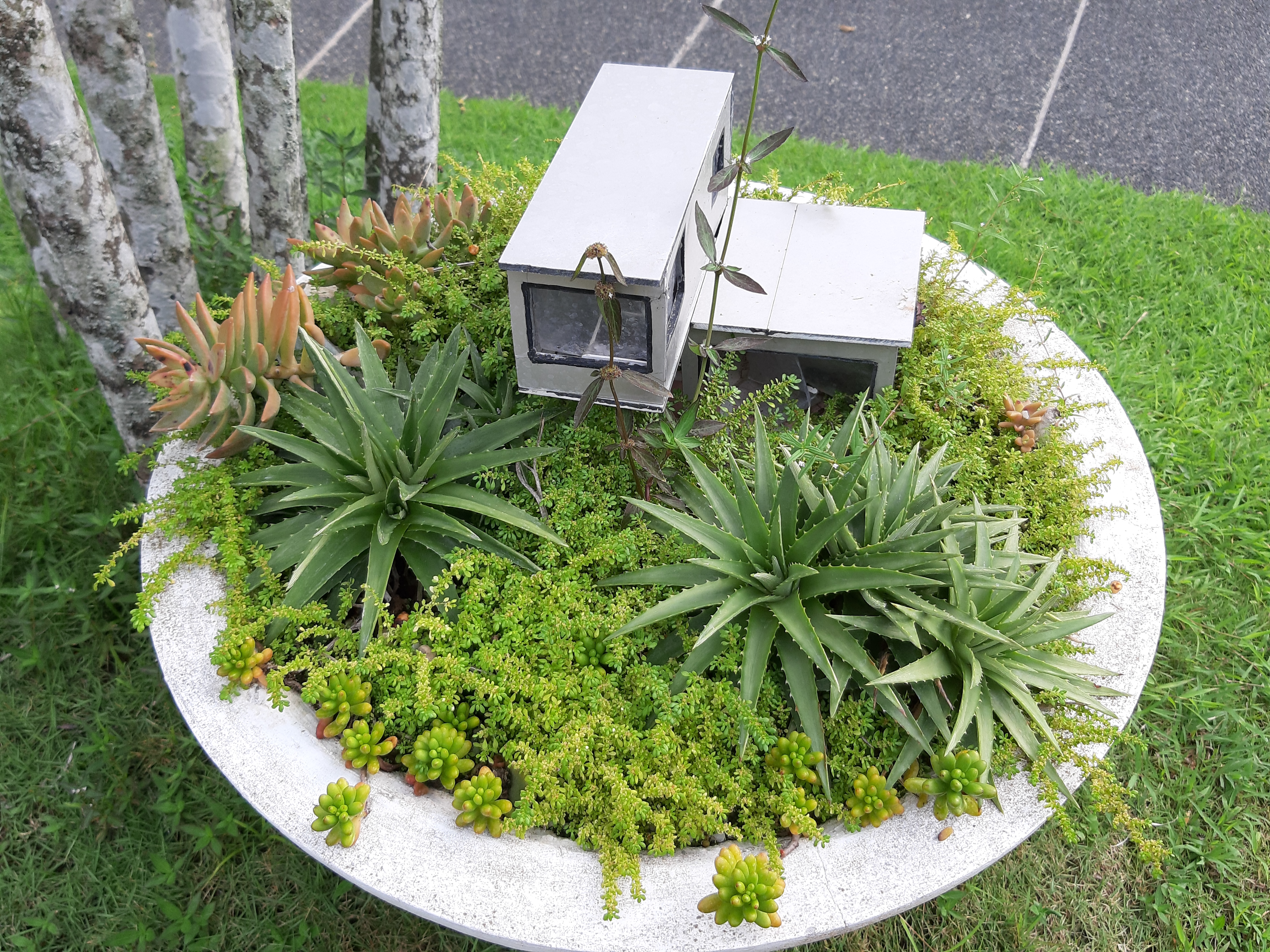
A dish garden.

A dish garden is a small open type of terrarium, usually one inside. Generally, they are in direct sunlight. They are in shallow and open containers, where a terrarium may be in a closed container.

Their history goes back to the Ancient Egypt and Ancient Greece, though our concept traces to Japan, during the Edo Period (about 1603—1868), inspired by the bonsai.

== Growth media ==
Depending upon the type of plants grown, the media chosen for the pot should vary, and the media should have good drainage as well. The media should hold adequate moisture and not be very fertile, as fertile media encourages rapid growth. Fast-draining media may contain sand, perlite and ingredients that help drainage, thus cactus and other succulent plants do not get too much water.

Most dish gardens are made with shallow, open dishes or bowls. They usually have multiple plants in the same container, often of various species. Succulents don't need deep media as they are often shallow rooting. The taste of the grower determines the container, but here are a few considerations:

1. A container needs to have enough room for the plants that will be in it.
2. A container needs enough growth media for its plants.
3. A container needs drainage holes, (not just a layer of gravel at the bottom of the pot), as without adequate drainage, plant roots may rot.
4. What the container is made of is also important:
  1. Plastic pots may get brittle if kept outdoors in the sun.
  2. Outdoor clay pots need more frequent watering.

== Plants grown in a dish garden ==
Cacti and succulents may do not do well in a terrarium, as it gets too humid. For such plants, a dish garden is better.

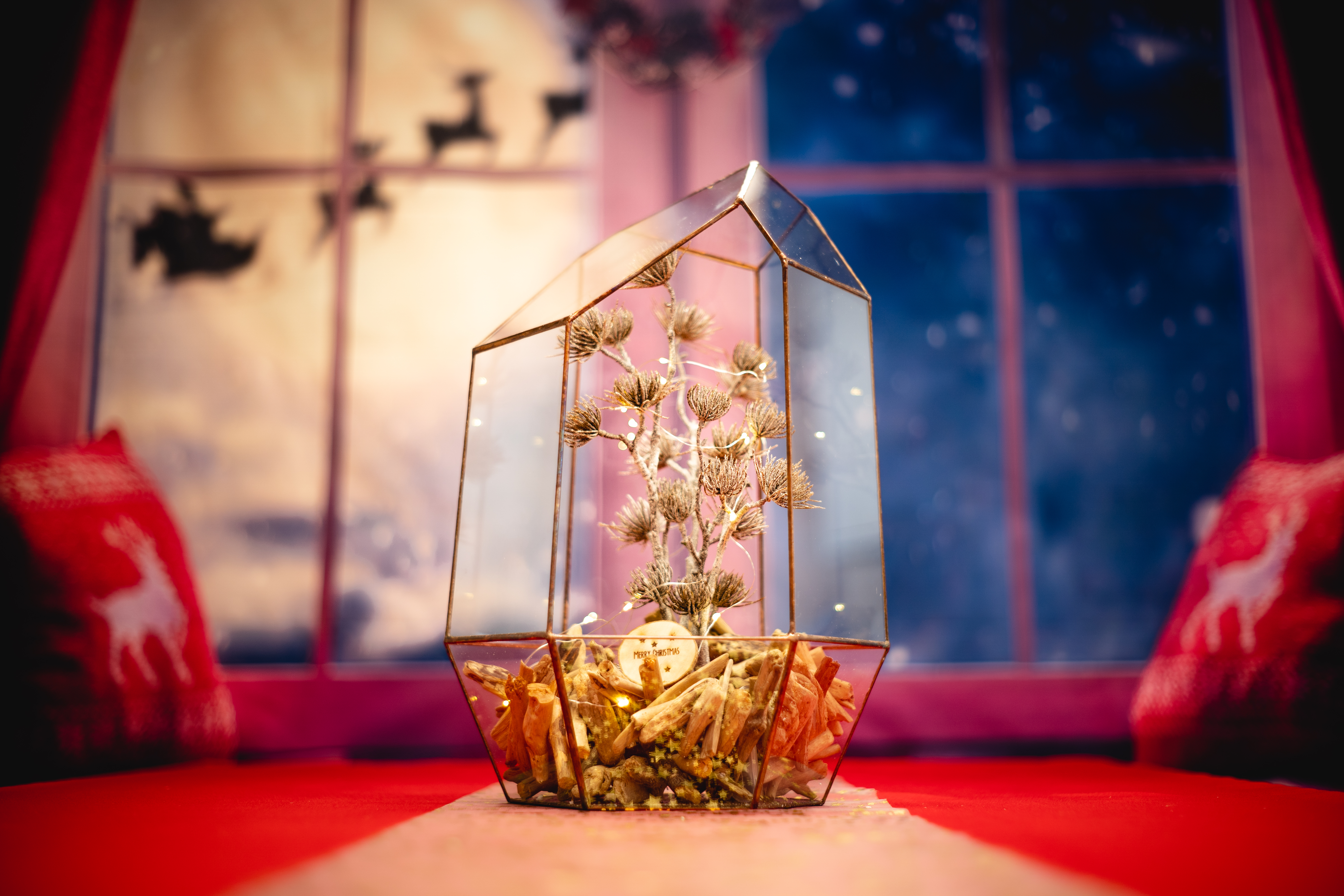
A terrarium may in a closed container.

The following plants are recommended

- African violets,
- Aloe,
- Begonia,
- Bromeliad
- Bonsai trees has been grown in dish gardens, for thousands of years,
- Peace lily,
- Philodendron,
- Poinsettia,
- Succulents in general

== See also ==
- Bioactive terrarium

== External links and references ==
- What is a dish garden (one)?
- What is a dish garden (two)?
- Dish Garden Definition
- Dish Gardening 101
