= Staavia phylicoides =

Scientific classification
- Kingdom: Plantae
- Clade: Tracheophytes
- Clade: Angiosperms
- Clade: Eudicots
- Clade: Asterids
- Order: Bruniales
- Family: Bruniaceae
- Genus: Staavia
- Species: S. phylicoides

Binomial name
- Staavia phylicoides Pillans

Species of plant

Staavia phylicoides is a perennial, flowering shrub that is part of the Staavia genus. The species is endemic to the Northern Cape and the Western Cape and is part of the fynbos. The plant occurs in the Bokkeveld Mountains. The only known population consists of only five plants. The plant grows on the southern slopes above 800 m.
