= Anubias barteri var. glabra =

Scientific classification
- Kingdom: Plantae
- Clade: Tracheophytes
- Clade: Angiosperms
- Clade: Monocots
- Order: Alismatales
- Family: Araceae
- Genus: Anubias
- Species: A. barteri
- Variety: A. b. var. glabra

Trinomial name
- Anubias barteri var. glabra N.E. Brown

Synonyms
- A. lanceolata N.E.Brown; A. minima Chevalier

Variety of aquatic plant

Anubias barteri var. glabra is a variety of A. barteri that was first described by N. E. Brown in 1901.

== Synonyms ==
- Anubias minima Chevalier, 1909
- Anubias lanceolata N. E. Brown

== Distribution ==
West Africa: Guinea, Liberia, Ivory Coast, Cameroon, Bioko, Gabon, Democratic Republic of the Congo.

== Description ==
This plant's long-stemmed dark green leave blades are less than 5 times as long as wide, 1.5–9 cm broad (usually broader than 3.5 cm) and 6–21 cm long. The petioles are 3–35 cm long, from 0.5 to 1.5 times as long as the blade.

== Cultivation ==
Like most Anubias species, this plant grows well partially and fully submersed and the rhizome must be above the substrate, attached to rocks or wood. It grows well in a range of lighting and prefers a temperature range of 22-28 degrees C. It can be propagated by dividing the rhizome or by separating side shoots.
