= Terrarium =

Container used for keeping plants and animals

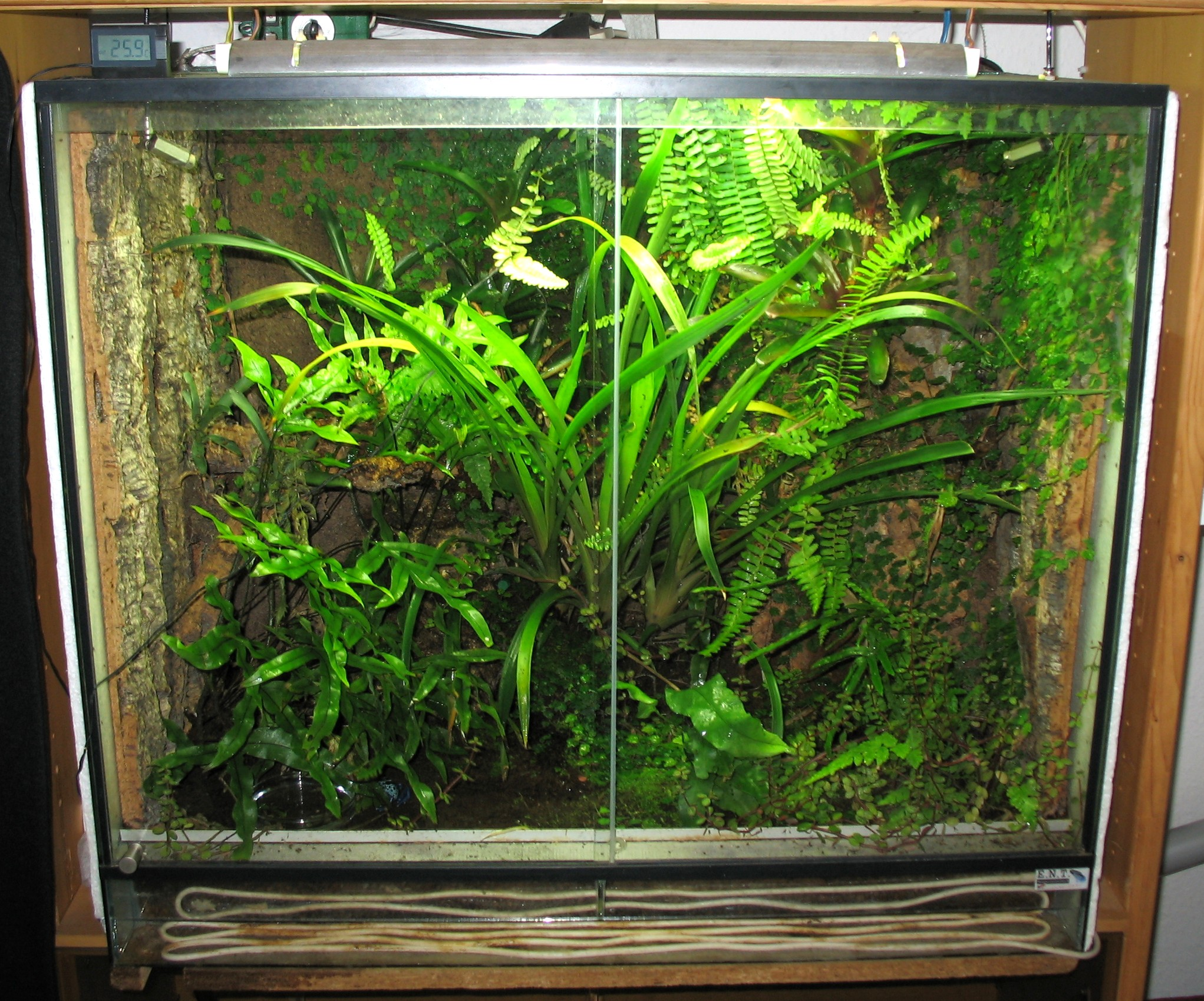
A temperature-controlled terrarium with plants inside

A terrarium (pl. terraria or terrariums) is a glass container containing soil and plants in an environment different from the surroundings. It is usually a sealable container that can be opened for maintenance or to access the plants inside; however, terraria can also be open to the atmosphere. Terraria are often kept as ornamental items.

A closed terrarium's transparent walls allow heat and light to enter, creating a very favorable environment for plant growth. Heat entering the sealed container allows the creation of a small water cycle due to evaporating moisture from the soil and plants. The water vapor then condenses onto the walls of the container, eventually falling back onto the plants and soil below. Light passing through the transparent walls allows photosynthesis. Open terraria are not sealed and are better suited to plants requiring a more arid environment.

== History ==
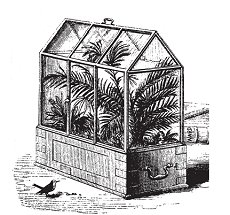
A drawing of a Wardian case

The first terrarium was created by botanist Nathaniel Bagshaw Ward in 1842. Ward had an interest in observing insect behaviour and accidentally left one of his jars unattended. A fern spore in the jar grew and germinated into a plant, becoming the first known terrarium. The trend quickly spread in the Victorian Era amongst the English. Instead of the terrarium, it was known as the Wardian case.

Ward hired carpenters to build his Wardian cases to export native British plants to Sydney, Australia. After months of travel, the plants arrived well and thriving. Likewise, plants from Australia sent to London using the same method were received by Ward in pristine condition. His experiment indicated plants can be sealed, without ventilation, and continue thriving. Wardian cases were used for many decades by Kew Gardens to ship plants around the British Empire and were also used during European colonization of Africa to bring African goods, like spices and coffee, back to Europe.

== Types ==
Terraria are typically classified into two categories: closed and open. Closed terraria are sealed shut with a lid, door, or cork; open terraria have access to fresh air, most commonly by leaving the container open or through a hole drilled into the container.

=== Closed terrarium ===
Diagram of sealed terrarium

Tropical plant varieties, such as moss, orchids, ferns, and air plants are generally kept within closed terraria to replicate their native humid, sheltered environment in the tropics. Keeping the terrarium sealed allows for circulation of water, making the terrarium self-sufficient. The terrarium may be opened once a week, allowing evaporation of excess moisture from the air and walls of the container, to prevent growth of mold or algae, which may damage plants and discolor the sides of the terrarium. Springtails may be used to consume mold or fungi within the terrarium.

Any wilting plants or absence of condensation on the walls of the terrarium indicates the terrarium requires water; watering is primarily done using a spray bottle.

Closed terrarium benefit from specific soil mixes to ensure ideal growing conditions and reduce risk of microbial damage; a common medium used is peat-lite: a mixture of peat moss, vermiculite, and perlite. The mixture should be sterile to minimize risk of introducing potentially harmful microbes to the terrarium.

=== Open terrarium ===
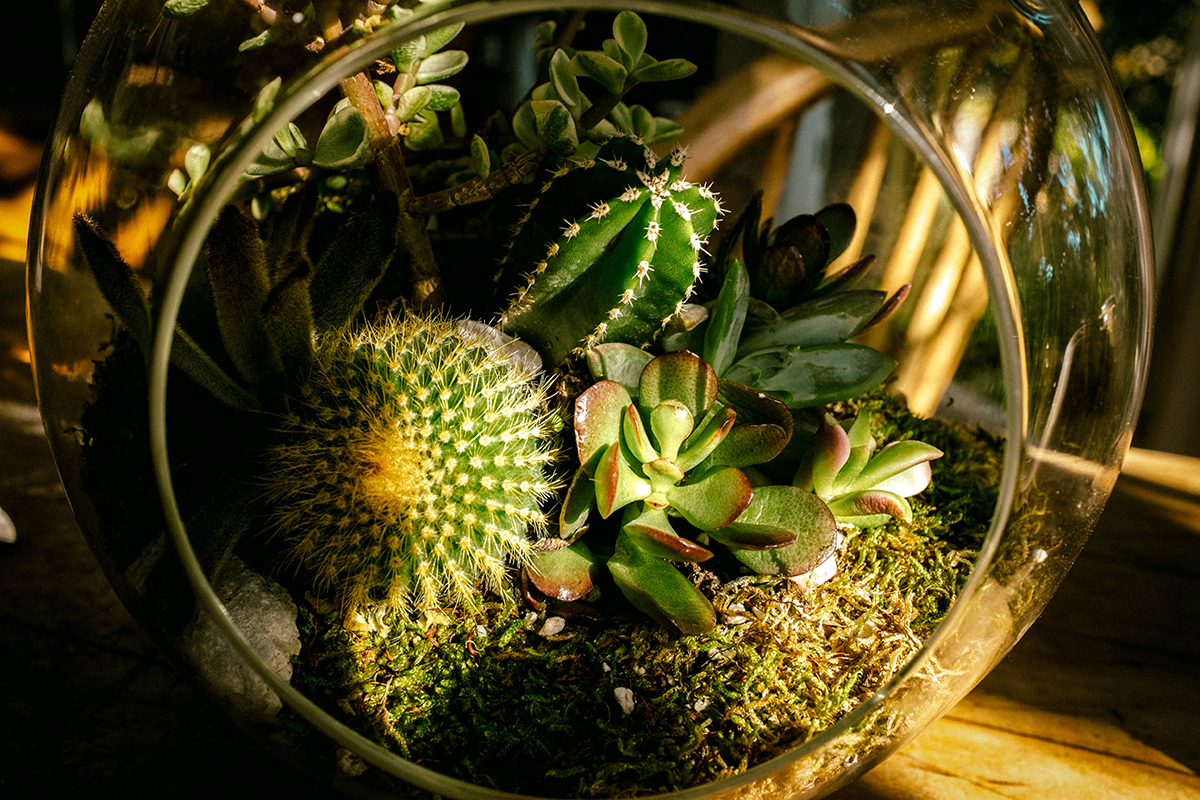
An open terrarium

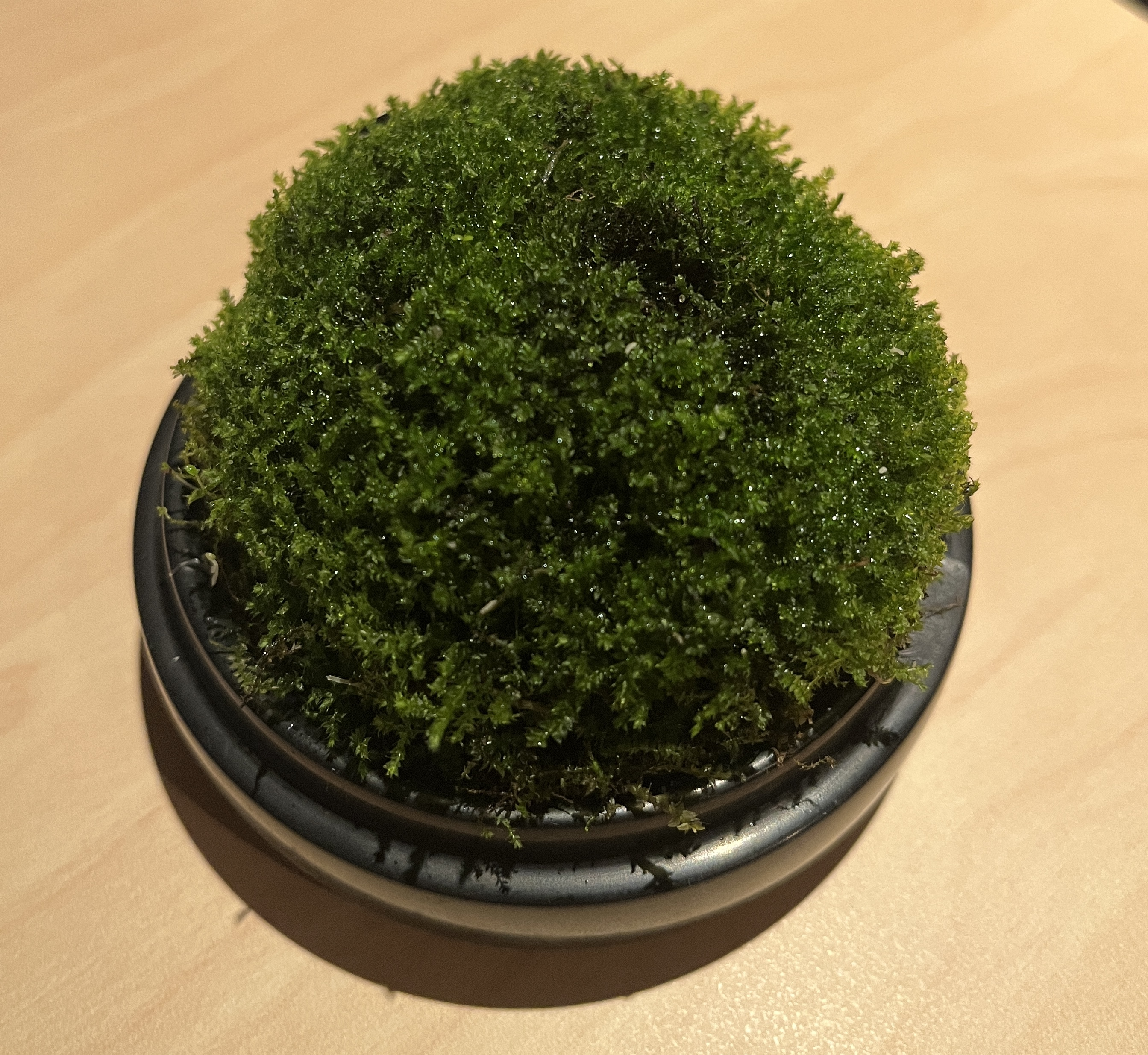
A container with moss without any glass, which may sometimes be considered an open terrarium

Not all plants require or are suited to the moist environment of closed terraria; open terraria are better suited for plants preferring less humidity and soil moisture, such as temperate plants and plants adapted to dry climates. Open terraria also work well for plants requiring more (but not direct) sunlight, as closed terraria can trap excess heat, potentially killing the plants inside. While open terraria require more watering than closed terraria, they have reduced risk of disease due to their lower humidity.

==== Difference from dish garden ====
An open terrarium should not be confused with a dish garden. A terrarium, even open, allows for increased humidity compared to the environment outside the structure, whereas a dish garden does not provide additional humidity. Due to the transparent walls of terraria causing magnification of the sun's rays, terraria cannot be placed in direct sunlight because the intense light will cause foliage to burn. A dish garden can tolerate direct sun, as long as it is planted with full sun-tolerant plants. Succulents and cacti are better suited for a dish garden than a terrarium because dish gardens allow succulents and cacti to be placed in the full sun they require without burning.

==== Difference from plant pot ====
While both terrariums and plant pots serve as containers for growing plants, they differ significantly in structure and function. A typical plant pot is an open container, usually made from ceramic, plastic, or terracotta, designed to hold soil and allow for natural air circulation and drainage. Plant pots enable easy watering and provide flexibility for a wide variety of plant species, including larger houseplants.

Terrariums, by contrast, are typically glass containers and can be either enclosed or open at the top. Enclosed terrariums create a more controlled environment by recycling moisture within the vessel, which raises humidity levels and makes them particularly suited to tropical or moisture-loving plants. Open terrariums provide a partially contained space for smaller plants like succulents and cacti, though they require more frequent care similar to conventional plant pots. In addition to their functional differences, terrariums are often considered decorative objects and are used to create miniature landscapes as part of home décor, whereas plant pots are typically more utilitarian in design and use.

== See also ==
- Aquarium
- Bottle garden
- Ecosphere (aquarium)
- Greenhouse
- Paludarium
- Vivarium
- Bonsai
