= Dahliaphyllum =

Scientific classification
- Kingdom: Plantae
- Clade: Tracheophytes
- Clade: Angiosperms
- Clade: Eudicots
- Clade: Asterids
- Order: Apiales
- Family: Apiaceae
- Subfamily: Apioideae
- Tribe: Selineae
- Genus: Dahliaphyllum; Constance & Breedlove
- Species: D. almedae

Binomial name
- Dahliaphyllum almedae Constance & Breedlove

Genus of flowering plants

Dahliaphyllum is a genus of flowering plants in the family Apiaceae. Its sole species is Dahliaphyllum almedae, native to Southwestern Mexico.

The genus is named after Anders Dahl (1751–1789), a Swedish botanist and student of Carl Linnaeus.
