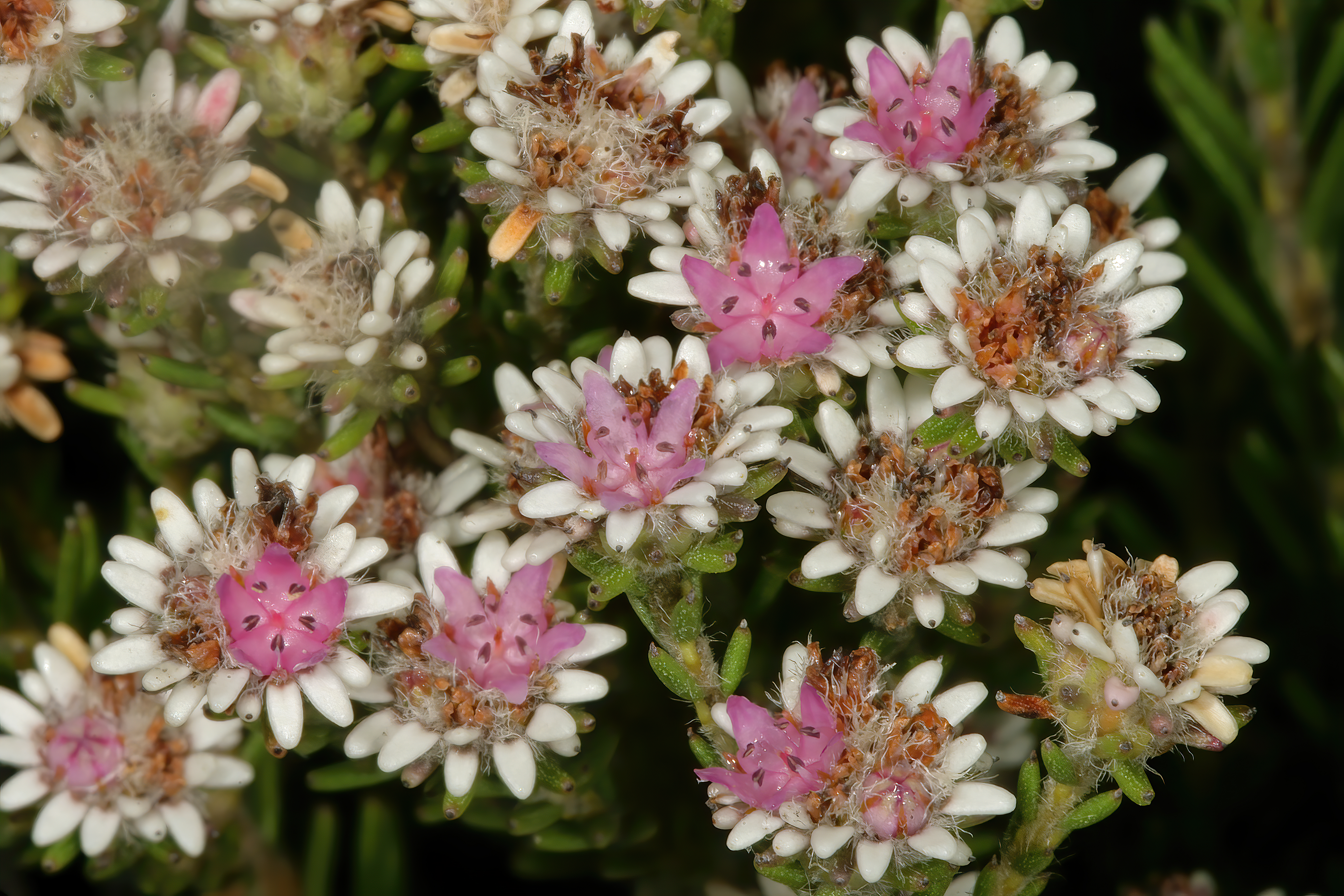

Scientific classification
- Kingdom: Plantae
- Clade: Tracheophytes
- Clade: Angiosperms
- Clade: Eudicots
- Clade: Asterids
- Order: Bruniales
- Family: Bruniaceae
- Genus: Staavia
- Species: S. radiata

Binomial name
- Staavia radiata (L.) Dahl

Synonyms
- Brunia radiata (L.) L.; Phylica radiata L.; Phylica nuda Burm.f.

= Staavia radiata =

Species of plant

Staavia radiata is a perennial, flowering shrub that is part of the Staavia genus. The species is endemic to the Western Cape and is part of the fynbos.
