= Anubias barteri var. angustifolia =

Scientific classification
- Kingdom: Plantae
- Clade: Tracheophytes
- Clade: Angiosperms
- Clade: Monocots
- Order: Alismatales
- Family: Araceae
- Genus: Anubias
- Species: A. barteri
- Variety: A. b. var. angustifolia

Trinomial name
- Anubias barteri var. angustifolia (Engler) Crusio

Synonyms
- A. lanceolata f. angustifolia Engler

Variety of aquatic plant

Anubias barteri var. angustifolia was first described by Adolf Engler in 1915 as A. lanceolata f. angustifolia. The species obtained varietal status within A. barteri in 1979.

== Synonyms ==
Anubias lanceolata f. angustifolia Engler.

== Distribution ==
West Africa: Guinea, Liberia, Ivory Coast, Cameroon.

== Description ==
This plant's long-stemmed dark green leave blades are 5-9 times as long as wide (up to 3.5 cm) and 8–15 cm long. The petioles are 4–33 cm long, from 0.5-1 times as long as the blade.

== Cultivation ==
Like most Anubias species, this plant grows well partially and fully submersed and the rhizome must be above the substrate, attached to rocks or wood. It grows well in a range of lighting and prefers a temperature range of 22-28 degrees C. It can be propagated by dividing the rhizome or by separating side shoots.
