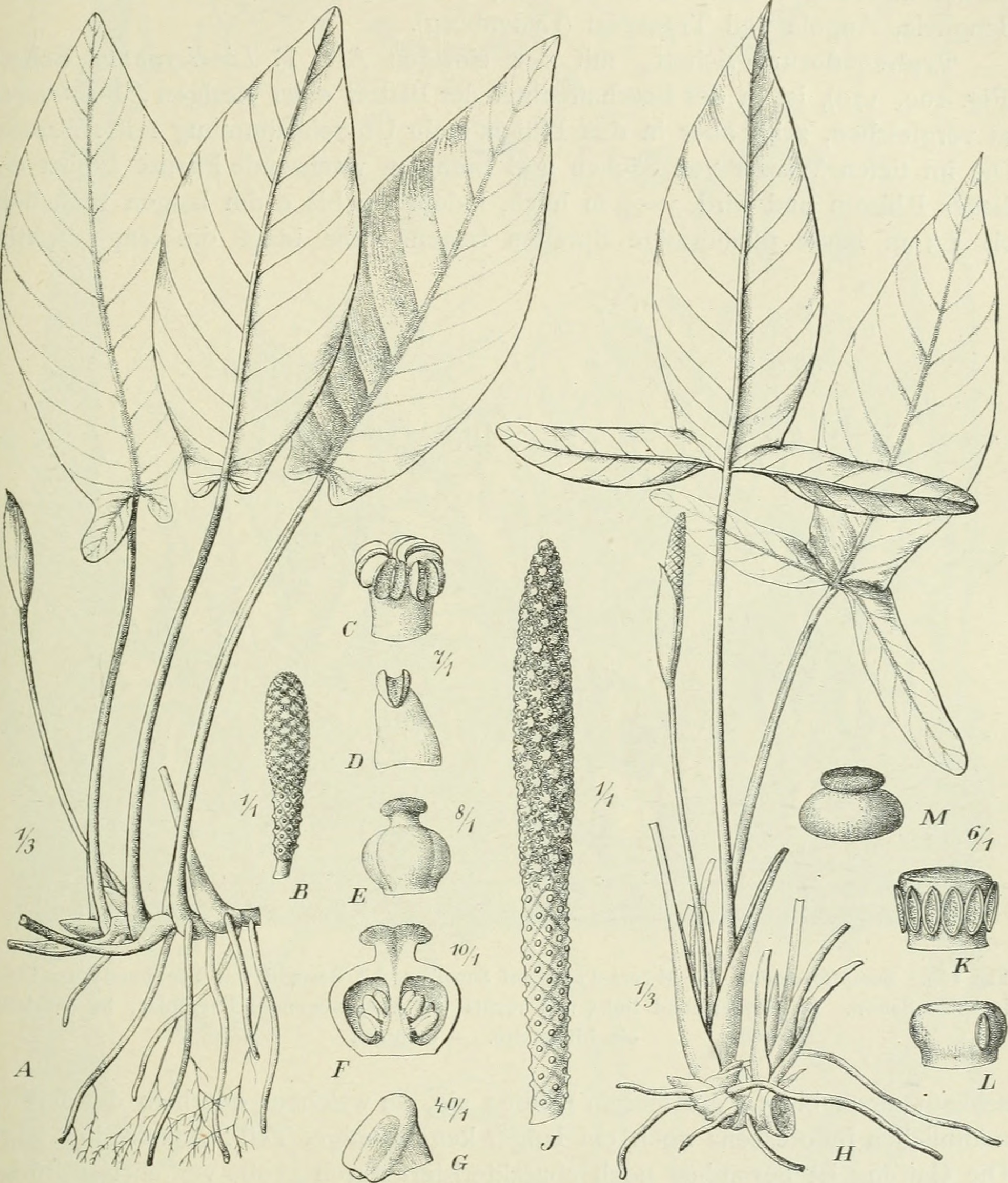

Conservation status
- Least Concern (IUCN 3.1)

Scientific classification
- Kingdom: Plantae
- Clade: Tracheophytes
- Clade: Angiosperms
- Clade: Monocots
- Order: Alismatales
- Family: Araceae
- Genus: Anubias
- Species: A. hastifolia

Binomial name
- Anubias hastifolia Engl.

Synonyms
- A. hastifolia var. sublobata Engler; A. auriculata Engler; A. haullevilleana De Wildeman; A. laurentii De Wildeman; Amauriella hastifolia (Engler) Hepper; A. auriculata (Engler) Hepper; A. obanensis (Engler) Hepper; A. talbotii nomen nudum

= Anubias hastifolia =

Species of aquatic plant

Anubias hastifolia is a species belonging to the Aroid genus Anubias. It was first mentioned by Adolf Engler in 1889 and described scientifically by him in 1893.

== Synonyms ==
The following names are synonyms of A. hastifolia: A. hastifolia var. sublobata Engler, 1893, A. auriculata Engler, 1899, A. haullevilleana De Wildeman, 1903, A. laurentii De Wildeman, 1910. In 1913, Rendle described the genus Amauriella, with one species, A. obanensis Rendle, 1913. Amauriella obanensis was subsequently reduced to a synonym of Anubias hastifolia and the genus Amauriella was merged into Anubias.

== Distribution ==
Ghana, Nigeria, Cameroon, Gabon, and Democratic Republic of the Congo.

== Description ==
A. hastifolia has leaf blades that can be up to 33 cm long and 14 cm wide and are rather variable in form, ranging from elliptic/oval to lance- or spear-shaped. The leaf stems are generally longer than the blade and up to 67 cm long. The leaves are set on a creeping and rooting rhizome that is 5 to 15 mm thick. The spathe is 2 to 4.5 cm long and has an up to 24 cm long peduncle. The spadix is 1.5 to 4 cm long and is about as long as the spathe. The upper part is covered with male flowers, of which the 4 to 6 stamens are fused into synandria, with the thecae on its sides. The lower part of the spadix is covered with female flowers that are reduced to the ovary and stigma.

== Ecology ==
The plant grows on the banks of little streams in the forest, on rocks, or in mud. It flowers throughout the year, fruiting from September till January.
