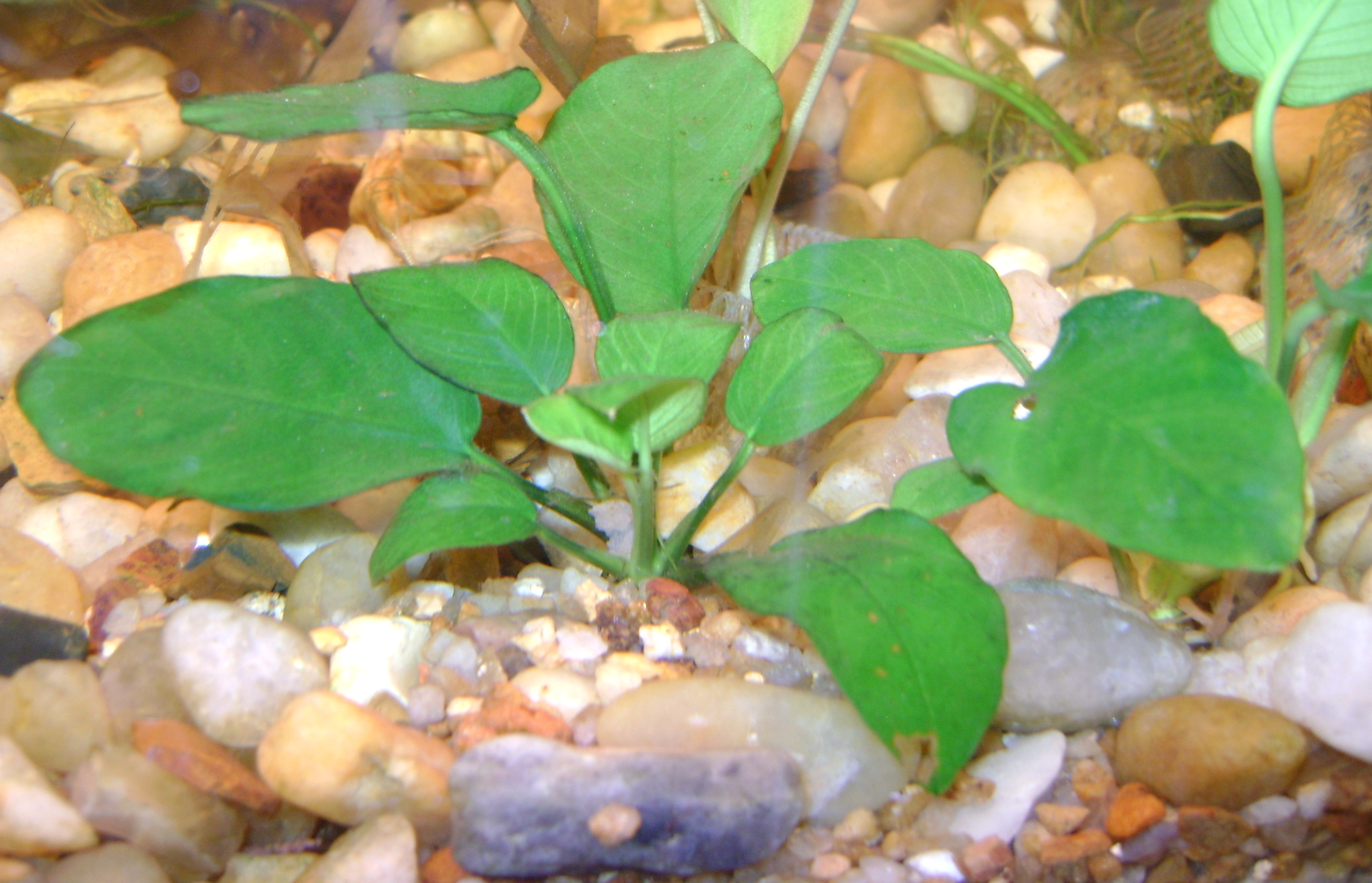

Scientific classification
- Kingdom: Plantae
- Clade: Embryophytes
- Clade: Tracheophytes
- Clade: Spermatophytes
- Clade: Angiosperms
- Clade: Monocots
- Order: Alismatales
- Family: Araceae
- Genus: Anubias
- Species: A. barteri
- Variety: A. b. var. nana

Trinomial name
- Anubias barteri var. nana (Engler) Crusio

Synonyms
- Anubias nana Engler

= Anubias barteri var. nana =

Variety of aquatic plant

Anubias barteri var. nana was first described by Adolf Engler in 1899 as A. nana. The species was reduced to varietal status in 1979.

== Common names ==
Dwarf Anubias.

== Distribution ==
West Africa: Only known from Victoria, Cameroon.

== Description ==
It is a dwarf variety of Anubias barteri. This plant's thick short-stemmed dark green leaves are some of the smallest and most compact in the Anubias genus, growing only to 8.1 cm (3.2 in) for a total height of 12 cm (4.7 in).

A variation of Anubias barteri var. nana known as Anubias barteri var. nana 'Gold' is available in the aquarium trade, it has light green to golden leaves.

== Cultivation ==
Like most Anubias species, this plant grows well partially and fully submersed and the rhizome must be above the substrate, attached to rocks or wood. It grows well in a range of lighting and has a temperature range of 20–28 °C (68–82 °F). It can be propagated by dividing the rhizome or by separating side shoots.
