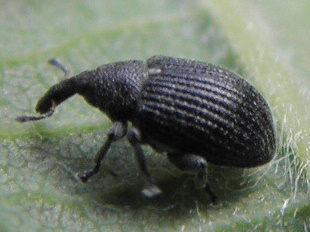
- Anoplus roboris

Scientific classification
- Domain: Eukaryota
- Kingdom: Animalia
- Phylum: Arthropoda
- Class: Insecta
- Order: Coleoptera
- Suborder: Polyphaga
- Infraorder: Cucujiformia
- Clade: Phytophaga
- Superfamily: Curculionoidea
- Family: Curculionidae
- Genus: Anoplus; Germar, 1820

Synonyms
- Nanaplus Gistel, 1856; Nanoplus Gistel, 1856

= Anoplus =

Genus of beetles

Anoplus is a genus of true weevils in the beetle family Curculionidae. There are about 10 described species in Anoplus, found in Europe and western Asia.

== Species ==
These 10 species belong to the genus Anoplus:

- Anoplus atratus Stephens, 1829
- Anoplus caucasicus Reitter, 1916
- Anoplus depilis Thomson
- Anoplus japonicus Morimoto, 1983
- Anoplus nitidulus Stephens, 1831
- Anoplus pericarti Tempère, 1972
- Anoplus plantaris (Næzén, 1794)
- Anoplus roboris Suffrian, 1840
- Anoplus setulosus Kirsch, 1870
- Anoplus sugiharai Kôno, 1935
