= Staavia brownii =

Scientific classification
- Kingdom: Plantae
- Clade: Tracheophytes
- Clade: Angiosperms
- Clade: Eudicots
- Clade: Asterids
- Order: Bruniales
- Family: Bruniaceae
- Genus: Staavia
- Species: S. brownii

Binomial name
- Staavia brownii Dümmer

Species of plant

Staavia brownii is a perennial, flowering shrub that is part of the Staavia genus. The species is endemic to the Western Cape and occurs in the Kogelberg. The plant is part of the fynbos and the two original subpopulations have disappeared but in 1997 a new subpopulation of 400 plants was discovered. The population may be threatened by wildfires.
