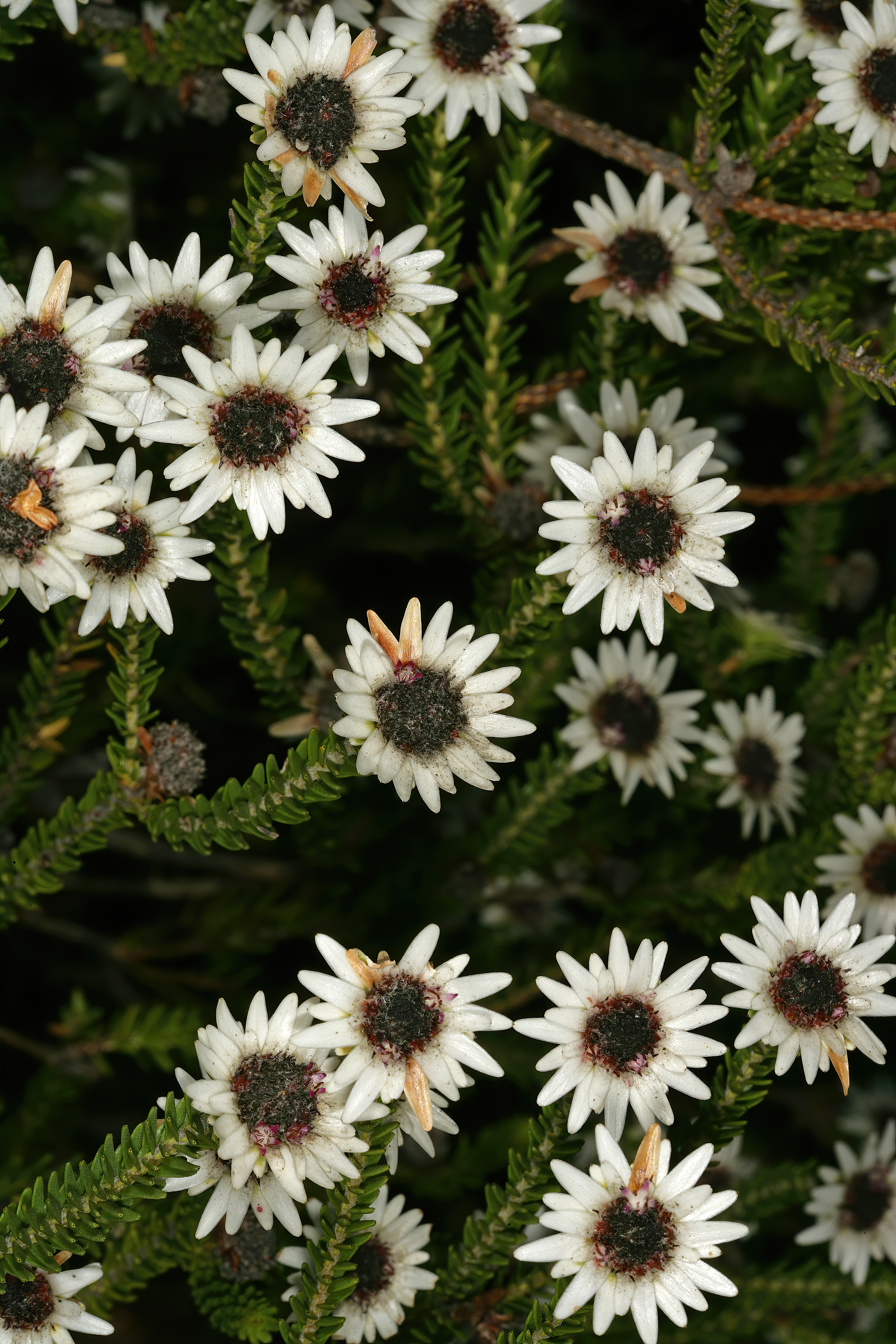

Scientific classification
- Kingdom: Plantae
- Clade: Tracheophytes
- Clade: Angiosperms
- Clade: Eudicots
- Clade: Asterids
- Order: Bruniales
- Family: Bruniaceae
- Genus: Staavia
- Species: S. dodii

Binomial name
- Staavia dodii Bolus

= Staavia dodii =

Species of plant

Staavia dodii is a perennial, flowering shrub that is part of the Staavia genus. The species is endemic to the Western Cape and is part of the fynbos. The plant occurs in the southernmost part of the Cape Peninsula in two subpopulations. It has a range of only 25 km² and is considered rare.
