= Staavia zeyheri =

Scientific classification
- Kingdom: Plantae
- Clade: Tracheophytes
- Clade: Angiosperms
- Clade: Eudicots
- Clade: Asterids
- Order: Bruniales
- Family: Bruniaceae
- Genus: Staavia
- Species: S. zeyheri

Binomial name
- Staavia zeyheri Sond.

Species of plant

Staavia zeyheri is a perennial, flowering shrub that is part of the Staavia genus. The species is endemic to the Western Cape and is part of the fynbos where it occurs in the Riviersonderend Mountains. A single population in an area of less than 1 km² may already be destroyed by invasive plants.
