= Anubias gilletii =

Conservation status
- Least Concern (IUCN 3.1)

Scientific classification
- Kingdom: Plantae
- Clade: Embryophytes
- Clade: Tracheophytes
- Clade: Spermatophytes
- Clade: Angiosperms
- Clade: Monocots
- Order: Alismatales
- Family: Araceae
- Genus: Anubias
- Species: A. gilletii

Binomial name
- Anubias gilletii De Wild.& T.Durand

Species of aquatic plant

Anubias gilletii is a plant that was first described scientifically in 1901 by Émile Auguste Joseph De Wildeman and Th. Durand.

== Distribution ==
Nigeria, Cameroon, Gabon, Republic of the Congo, and Democratic Republic of the Congo.

== Description ==
Its long-stalked medium-green leaves are spear-shaped and may grow to about 40 cm in length. It grows in muddy areas near, or in streams, sometimes even completely submerged.

== Cultivation ==
This plant grows best when only partially submersed and when not crowded by other plants. It requires a lot of nutrients, a loose, iron-rich substrate, and moderate-to-strong light. It prefers a temperature range of 22-26 degrees C (72-79 degrees F). It can be propagated by dividing the rhizome or by its seed.
