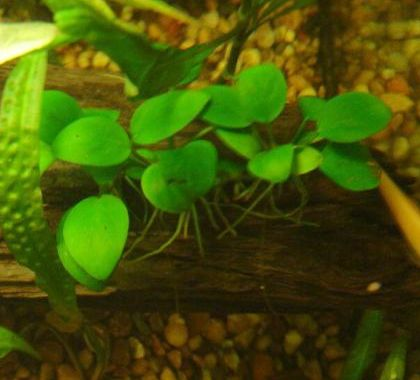
- Anubias barteri var. nana on a bogwood (top view)

Scientific classification
- Kingdom: Plantae
- Clade: Tracheophytes
- Clade: Angiosperms
- Clade: Monocots
- Order: Alismatales
- Family: Araceae
- Subfamily: Aroideae
- Tribe: Anubiadeae
- Genus: Anubias; Schott

Type species
- A. afzelii Schott

Species
- Anubias afzelii; Anubias barteri; Anubias barteri var. angustifolia; Anubias barteri var. barteri; Anubias barteri var. caladiifolia; Anubias barteri var. glabra; Anubias barteri var. nana; Anubias gigantea; Anubias gilletii; Anubias gracilis; Anubias hastifolia; Anubias heterophylla; Anubias pynaertii

Synonyms
- Amauriella Rendle

= Anubias =

Genus of flowering plants

Anubias is a genus of aquatic and semi-aquatic flowering plants in the family Araceae, native to tropical central and western Africa. They primarily grow in rivers and streams but can also be found in marshes. They are characterized by broad, thick, dark leaves that come in many different forms. The genus was revised in 1979 and since then its nomenclature has been stable. Species can be determined by using mostly characteristics of the inflorescence. Because of the often shady places where the plants grow, the genus was named after the Egyptian god Anubis, the god of the afterlife. The genus was first described in 1857 by Heinrich Wilhelm Schott, with A. afzelii as its type species.

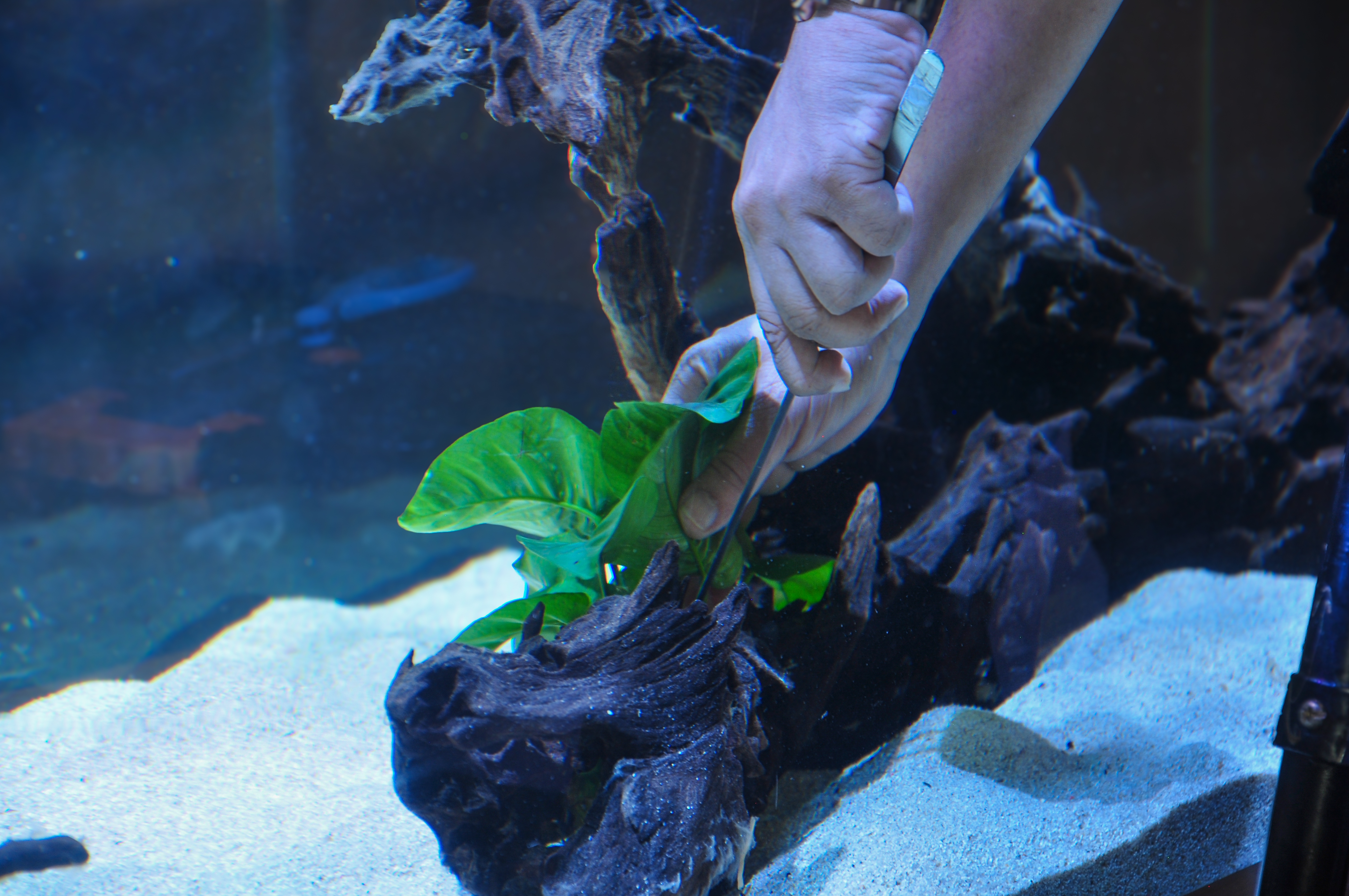
Aquascapist Planting Anubias on Driftwood

== Reproduction and uses ==
Anubias, most notably the varying forms of A. barteri, are commonly used in aquariums, usually attached to rocks or bogwood. In contrast to most plants, Anubias generally prefer subdued lighting and can also produce flowers underwater. In the aquarium they should be placed in shaded areas; otherwise algae will develop on the leaves.

Anubias are considered by many aquarists to be some of the easiest plants to maintain, since their light and nutrient requirements are very low and also because herbivorous fish will not eat them (with a few exceptions). This is why Anubias are some of the few plants that can be used in aquariums with African cichlids and goldfish.

Reproduction in artificial environments can be accomplished by stolon division or from side shoots. The stolon must always be above the substrate in order to survive; otherwise it will rot and the plant will die. Rather than planting Anubias directly into the soil, they should be attached to a piece of rock or driftwood, as they are more likely to grow and thrive when the rhizome and roots are left exposed instead of buried. It is also possible to propagate Anubias by seed.

The natural growth rate of all species in this genus is rather slow. Usually, they produce a leaf every 3 weeks, or even slower. And while they were once thought to be among the few plants that do not respond to CO₂ addition, hobbyists have seen great results and improved growth with CO₂ and high light intensity.

The most commonly available species of this genus is Anubias barteri Schott, which is polymorphic and subdivided into several varieties. The largest members of the genus are Anubias gigantea Chevalier ex Hutchinson and Anubias heterophylla Engler. Their leaf-stems can grow up to 83 cm, with leaves 40 cm long and 14 cm broad with lateral lobes up to 28 cm long and 10 cm broad. The smallest representative is Anubias barteri var. nana (Engler) Crusio, with a height up to 10 cm and with leaves up to 6 cm long and 3 cm broad.

Anubias can be grown emersed (above water). For this reason they may be used in paludariums.

== Species and varieties ==
Anubias afzelii Schott

- Narrow-leafed, medium-sized Anubias
- Characteristics: plant with stolon
- Leaf-stem: up to 20 cm
- Leaves: 13–35 cm long, 3–13 cm broad
- Height in aquarium: 25 – 30 cm

Optimal conditions:

- Temperature: 22 – 28 °C
- pH: 6.0 - 7.0
- Water hardness: 2 dGH - 6 dGH
- Position in aquarium: middle to back
- Usual growth rate: one leaf every 2 months

Anubias barteri Schott

Common varieties:

Anubias barteri var. angustifolia (Engler) Crusio

- Synonym: Anubias lanceolata f. angustifolia Engler
- Narrow leaves, similar to afzelii, but much smaller
- Leaf-stem: up to 32 cm
- Leaves: up to 18 cm long, up to 3.5 cm wide
- Height in aquarium: 10 – 15 cm

Optimal conditions:

- Temperature: 20 – 27 °C
- pH: 5.5 - 8.0
- Water hardness: < 8 dGH
- Position in aquarium: middle
- Usual growth rate: one leaf every 2 months

Anubias barteri var. barteri

- Compact, heart-shaped anubias
- Leaf-stem: up to 23 cm
- Leaves: 7–23 cm long, 4–11 cm wide
- Height in aquarium: 25 – 45 cm

Optimal conditions:

- Temperature: 20 – 27 °C
- pH: 5.5 – 9.0
- Water hardness: < 20 dGH
- Position in aquarium: back
- Usual growth rate: one leaf every 3 months

Anubias barteri var. caladiifolia Engler

- Heart-shaped anubias
- Leaf-stem: up to 54 cm
- Leaves: 10–23 cm long, 5–14 cm wide
- Height in aquarium: 7 – 30 cm

Optimal conditions:

- Temperature: 20 - 27 °C
- pH: 5.5 - 8.0
- Water hardness: < 20 dGH
- Position in aquarium: middle to back
- Usual growth rate: one leaf every 2 months

Anubias barteri var. glabra N. E. Brown

- Synonyms: Anubias lanceolata N. E. Brown, Anubias minima Chevalier.
- Narrow-leafed, large anubias
- Leaf-stem: up to 35 cm long
- Leaves: spear-shaped, up to 21 cm long, 9 cm wide
- Height in aquarium: 30 – 50 cm

Optimal conditions:

- Temperature: 22 - 27 °C
- pH: 5.5 - 8.0
- Water hardness: < 20 dGH
- Position in aquarium: back
- Usual growth rate: 4 - 8 leaves per year

Anubias barteri var. nana (Engler) Crusio

- Synonym: Anubias nana Engler
- Dwarf, creeping, with heart-shaped leaves
- Leaf-stem: up to 5 cm long
- Leaves: up to 6 cm long and 3 cm wide
- Height in aquarium: 5 – 10 cm

Optimal conditions:

- Temperature: 22 - 27 °C
- pH: 5.5 - 9.0
- Water hardness: 3 - 10 dGH
- Position in aquarium: front
- Usual growth rate: one leaf every month

Anubias gigantea Chevalier ex Hutchinson

- Synonyms: Anubias gigantea var. tripartita Chevalier, Anubias hastifolia var. robusta Engler
- Large arrow-shaped leaves
- Leaf-stem: up to 83 cm long
- Leaves: up to 30 cm long and 14 cm wide, with large lateral lobes up to 28 cm long and 10 cm broad
- Seldom used in aquariums

Anubias gilletii De Wildeman & Durand

- Initially heart-shaped, later with long rear fringes
- Leaf-stem: up to 40 cm
- Leaves: arrow-shaped, 25 cm long, 12 – 13 cm wide, lateral lobes up to 13 cm long
- Height in aquarium: 25 – 40 cm

Optimal conditions:

- Temperature: 22 - 27 °C
- pH: 6.0 - 8.0
- Water hardness: 4 - 10 dGH
- Position in aquarium: back
- Usual growth rate: 2 - 6 leaves per year

Anubias gracilis Chevalier ex Hutchinson

- Whether this is a separate species or another variety of Anubias barteri is doubtful
- Leaf-stem: up to 33 cm
- Leaves: triangular heart-shaped, 12 cm long, 4–10 cm wide, lateral lobes up to 7 cm long and 3 cm wide
- Height in aquarium: 20 – 30 cm

Optimal conditions:

- Temperature: 24 - 27 °C
- pH: 6.0 - 8.0
- Water hardness: 5 - 12 dGH
- Position in aquarium: middle to back
- Usual growth rate: 2 - 6 leaves per year

Anubias hastifolia Engler

- Synonyms: Amauriella hastifolia (Engler) Hepper, Anubias hastifolia var. sublobata Engler, Anubias auriculata Engler, Amauriella auriculata (Engler) Hepper, Anubias haullevilleana De Wildeman, Anubias laurentii De Wildeman, Amauriella obanensis Rendle, Amauriella talbotii Rendle
- Leaves: long heart-shaped
- Leaf-stem: up to 67 cm long
- Leaves: up to 33 cm long and 14 cm wide, lateral lobes up to 26 cm long and 8 cm broad
- Height in aquarium: 30 – 50 cm

Optimal conditions:

- Temperature: 22 - 27 °C
- pH: 6.0 - 8.0
- Water hardness: < 20 dGH
- Position in aquarium: middle to back
- Usual growth rate: 2 - 6 leaves per year

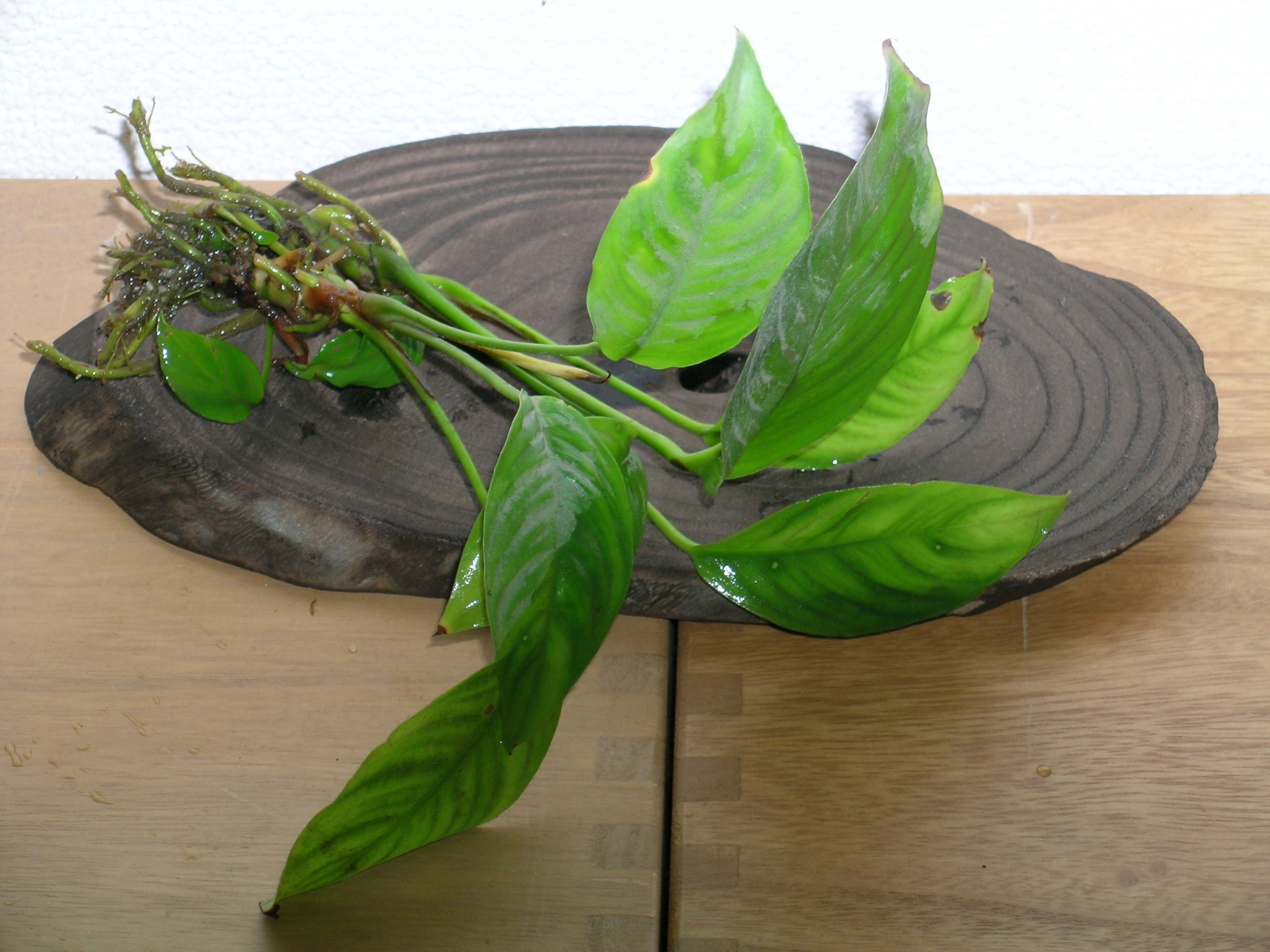
Anubias heterophylla

Anubias heterophylla Engler

- Synonyms: Anubias congensis N. E. Brown, Anubias congensis var. crassispadix Engler, Anubias affinis De Wildeman, Anubias engleri De Wildeman, Anubias bequaerti De Wildeman, Anubias undulata (trade name)
- Very large species, for tall aquariums
- Leaf-stem: up to 66 cm long
- Leaves: 38 cm long, 13 cm wide, sometimes with very short basal lobes
- Height in aquarium: 25 – 60 cm

Optimal conditions:

- Temperature: 24 - 27 °C
- pH: 5.5 - 8.0
- Water hardness: 5 - 12 dGH
- Position in aquarium: back
- Usual growth rate: 2 - 4 leaves per year

Anubias pynaertii De Wildeman

- Leaf-stem: up to 45 cm
- Leaves: up to 29 cm long and 14 cm broad

== See also ==
- Aquatic plant
- List of freshwater aquarium plant species
