= Adam Afzelius =

Swedish botanist (1750–1837)

Adam Afzelius FRS
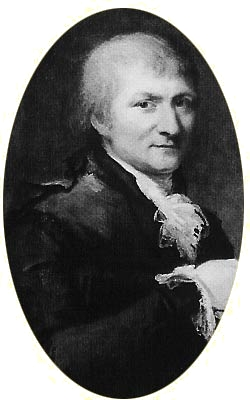
- A. Afzelius, oil by C.F. Breda.
- Born: 8 October 1750; Larv, Västergötland, Sweden
- Died: 20 January 1837 (aged 86); Uppsala, Sweden
- Occupations: Botanist, Zoologist
- Relatives: Johan Afzelius (brother) Pehr von Afzelius (brother)
- Scientific career
- Author abbrev. (botany): Afzel.

Adam Afzelius (8 October 1750 – 20 January 1837) was a Swedish botanist and zoologist, and an apostle of Carl Linnaeus. Afzelius was born at Larv in Västergötland in 1750. He was appointed teacher of oriental languages at Uppsala University in 1777, and in 1785 demonstrator of botany. In 1793 he was elected a member of the Royal Swedish Academy of Sciences. In 1800, Adam Afzelius became member of the German Academy of Sciences Leopoldina.

Between 1792 and 1796, as part of the Sierra Leone Company, he made two journeys to West Africa, where he reported on the geography, climate and natural resources of the region. While there, he also collected botanical specimens that were later acquired by Uppsala University.

In 1797–98, he acted as secretary of the Swedish embassy in London and on 19 April 1798, he was elected Fellow of the Royal Society. Returning to Sweden, he again took up his position as botanices demonstrator at Uppsala, and was in 1802 elected president of the "Zoophytolithic Society" (later called the Linnaean Institute). In 1812 he became professor of materia medica at the university. He died in Uppsala in 1837. In addition to various botanical writings, he published the autobiography of Carl Linnaeus in 1823.

His brother, Johan Afzelius (1753–1837), was professor of chemistry at Uppsala; and another brother, Pehr von Afzelius (1760–1843; the "von" was added when he was ennobled), who became a professor of medicine at Uppsala in 1801, was distinguished as a medical teacher and practitioner.

The botanical genus Afzelia (subfamily Caesalpinioideae) commemorates his name, and in 1857, the plant species Anubias afzelii was named after him by Heinrich Wilhelm Schott. The standard author abbreviation Afzel. is used to indicate this person as the author when citing a botanical name.

== Works ==
- De vegetabilibus svecanis observationes et experimenta, 1785.
- "The botanical history of Trifolium alpestre, medium, and pretense", London: Benjamin White and Son, 1791.
- "Observations on the genus Pausus, and description of a new species", London: Benjamin White and Son, 1798.
- Genera Plantarum Guineensium, 1804.
- Remedia guineensia quorum collectionem quintam, 1813–17 (one of many authors).
- Stirpium in Guinea medicinalium species novæ, 1818.
- Reliquiae Afzelianae : sistentes icones fungorum quos in Guinea collegit et in aere incisas excudi; curavit Adamus Afzelius. interpretatur Elias Magnus Fries (1860).
- "Adam Afzelius Sierra Leone Journal 1795–1796" (translated into English, 1967; Alexander Peter Kup; Carl Gösta Widstrand).
