= Johan Afzelius =

Swedish chemist (1753–1837)

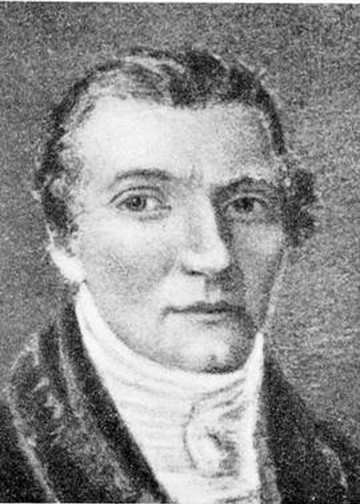
- Johan Afzelius
- Born: 13 June 1753; Larv, Sweden
- Died: 20 May 1837 (aged 83); Uppsala, Sweden
- Occupation: Chemist
- Relatives: Adam Afzelius (brother); Pehr von Afzelius (brother)

Johan Afzelius (13 June 1753 in Larv – 20 May 1837 in Uppsala) was a Swedish chemist and notable as the doctoral advisor of one of the founders of modern chemistry, Jöns Jacob Berzelius. He was the brother of botanist Adam Afzelius and physician Pehr von Afzelius.

Afzelius received his PhD at Uppsala University in 1776 under Torbern Olof Bergman. In 1780 he became a lecturer at Uppsala and in 1784 a professor of chemistry. From 1792 to 1797 he undertook research trips to Norway, Denmark and Russia in order to study mineral deposits and to visit scientific institutions. His remarkable mineral collection became part of Uppsala University's mineral cabinet.

Afzelius did mineral analyses, and made contributions to the journal Afhandlingar i fysik, kemi och mineralogi (Treatises on physics, chemistry and mineralogy). He is notable for having isolated formic acid from ants and showing that formic acid was different from the closely related acetic acid. He also studied the chemistry of nickel and oxalic acid.

In 1801, he was elected a member of the Royal Swedish Academy of Sciences.

== Published works ==
- Dissertatio chemica de niccolo, (with Torbern Bergman), 1775 – dissertation on nickel.
- Dissertatio chemica de acido sacchari (with Torbern Bergman), 1776 – dissertation on saccharinic acid.
- Dissertatio chemica de acido formicarum, (with Petrus Öhrn), 1777 – dissertation on formic acid.
- Dissertatio chemica de baroselenite (with Axel Fryxell) 1788 – dissertation on barium selenite.
