= Larv =

- Location within Västra Götaland Location within Sweden
- Coordinates: 58°11′N 13°07′E
- Country: Sweden
- Province: Västergötland
- County: Västra Götaland County
- Municipality: Vara Municipality

Area
  - Total: 0.40 km^{2} (0.15 sq mi)

Population (2005-12-31)
  - Total: 216
  - Density: 541/km^{2} (1,400/sq mi)
- Time zone: UTC+1 (CET)
  - Summer (DST): UTC+2 (CEST)

Larv is a village situated in Vara Municipality, Västra Götaland County, Sweden with 216 inhabitants in 2005. It was the birthplace of the botanist Adam Afzelius.
