= Johan Gustaf Acrel =

Swedish physician and Professor of Medicine

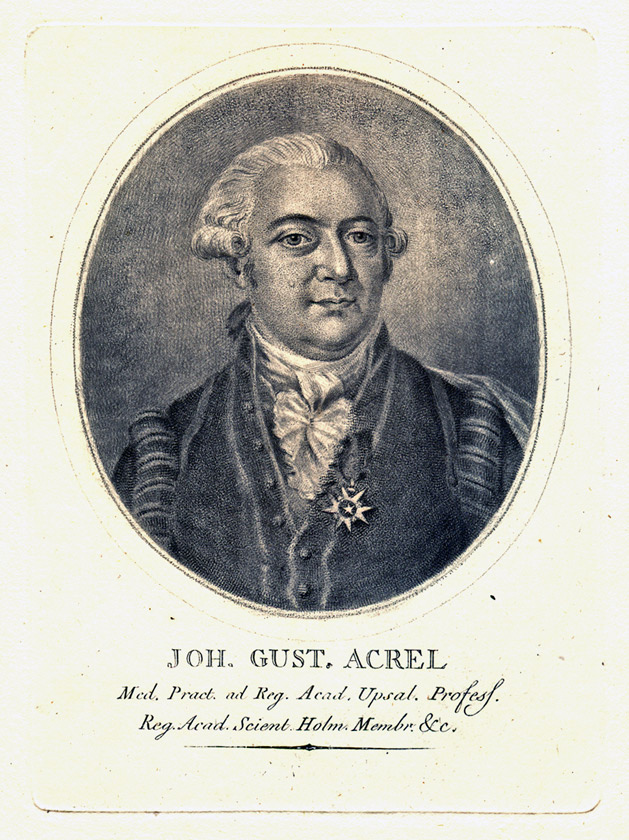
- Born: May 15, 1741; Stockholm
- Died: February 18, 1801 (aged 59)

Johan Gustaf Acrel (May 15, 1741 – February 18, 1801) was a Swedish physician and Professor of Medicine at Uppsala University. He was also briefly Rector Magnificus at the same university.

Acrel was born in Stockholm, Sweden. After medical studies at the Serafimerlasarettet hospital in Stockholm he went to Uppsala to study medicine. He became a Master of the Society of Surgeons (Kirurgiska societeten) in Stockholm 1763. He was then appointed Feldsher in Malmö. In 1765 he became Doctor of Medicine in Uppsala. Back in Uppsala his reputation grew as one of Europe's finest physicians. He undertook several trips to Germany and France. In 1788 he was appointed Professor of Practical Medicine at Uppsala University, and in 1779 he was made a Member of the Royal Swedish Academy of Sciences. He was also Rector Magnificus of Uppsala University during the spring of 1796.
