= Xanthoparmelia duplicata =

Scientific classification
- Kingdom: Fungi
- Division: Ascomycota
- Class: Lecanoromycetes
- Order: Lecanorales
- Family: Parmeliaceae
- Genus: Xanthoparmelia
- Species: X. duplicata

Binomial name
- Xanthoparmelia duplicata Hale (1986)

Species of lichen-forming fungus

Xanthoparmelia duplicata is a species of terricolous (ground-dwelling), foliose lichen in the family Parmeliaceae. Found in South Africa, it was formally described as a new species in 1986 by the American lichenologist Mason Hale. The type specimen was collected from Cape Province at an elevation of about 200 m (660 ft), where it was found in a pasture, growing on the soil over quartzite pebbles. It contains several secondary metabolites (lichen products): protocetraric acid, 4-O-demethylbarbatic acid, usnic acid, skyrin, and an unnamed substance related to diffractaic acid.

== See also ==
- List of Xanthoparmelia species
