= Xanthoparmelia lesothoensis =

Scientific classification
- Kingdom: Fungi
- Division: Ascomycota
- Class: Lecanoromycetes
- Order: Lecanorales
- Family: Parmeliaceae
- Genus: Xanthoparmelia
- Species: X. lesothoensis

Binomial name
- Xanthoparmelia lesothoensis Hale (1986)

Species of lichen-forming fungus

Xanthoparmelia lesothoensis is a species of saxicolous (rock-dwelling), foliose lichen in the family Parmeliaceae. Found at high elevations in the Drakensberg escarpment of Lesotho, it was formally described as a new species in 1986 by the American lichenologist Mason Hale. The type specimen was collected from a pasture east of Sani Pass at an elevation of 2,875 m (9,432 ft), where it was found growing on sun-exposed dolerite rock ledges. The lichen has a leathery, yellowish-green thallus that is tightly attached to its rock substrate and reaches 3–5 cm (1.2–2.0 in) in diameter. It contains salazinic acid, diffractaic acid, and usnic acid.

== See also ==
- List of Xanthoparmelia species
