= Xanthoparmelia olifantensis =

Scientific classification
- Kingdom: Fungi
- Division: Ascomycota
- Class: Lecanoromycetes
- Order: Lecanorales
- Family: Parmeliaceae
- Genus: Xanthoparmelia
- Species: X. olifantensis

Binomial name
- Xanthoparmelia olifantensis Hale (1986)

Species of lichen

Xanthoparmelia olifantensis is a species of saxicolous (rock-dwelling), foliose lichen in the family Parmeliaceae. Found in Southern Africa, it was formally described as a new species in 1986 by the American lichenologist Mason Hale. The type specimen was collected from Olifantsbaal in the Cape of Good Hope Nature Reserve (Cape Province), where it was found growing on rock ledges above a beach. Its thallus is tightly attached to its rock substrate, so much so that it appears to be almost crustose in places. Yellowish-green in color, it measures 2–3 cm (0.8–1.2 in) broad and comprises more or less linear lobes that are 0.4–0.6 mm wide. It contains norstictic acid, salazinic acid, and usnic acid. Xanthoparmelia olifantensis is somewhat similar to X. minuta in appearance and chemistry, but the latter species has isidia and traces of gyrophoric acid.

== See also ==
- List of Xanthoparmelia species
