= Xanthoparmelia ochropulchra =

Scientific classification
- Kingdom: Fungi
- Division: Ascomycota
- Class: Lecanoromycetes
- Order: Lecanorales
- Family: Parmeliaceae
- Genus: Xanthoparmelia
- Species: X. ochropulchra

Binomial name
- Xanthoparmelia ochropulchra Hale (1986)

Species of lichen

Xanthoparmelia ochropulchra is a species of saxicolous (rock-dwelling), foliose lichen in the family Parmeliaceae. Found in Southern Africa, it was formally described as a new species in 1986 by the American lichenologist Mason Hale. The type specimen was collected from Cape Province at an elevation of about 900 m (3,000 ft), where it was found growing on exfoliating granitic rock outcrops amongst karoo vegetation. The lichen thallus, which is tightly attached to its rock substrate, is soft and friable, and yellowish-green in colour. It measures 3–8 cm (1.2–3.1 in) in diameter, comprising somewhat irregularly shaped lobes that are 0.6–1.4 mm wide. It contains endocrocin, an unidentified anthraquinone pigment, and a depside compound related to diffractaic acid and usnic acid.

== See also ==
- List of Xanthoparmelia species
