= Xanthoparmelia rubromedulla =

Scientific classification
- Kingdom: Fungi
- Division: Ascomycota
- Class: Lecanoromycetes
- Order: Lecanorales
- Family: Parmeliaceae
- Genus: Xanthoparmelia
- Species: X. rubromedulla

Binomial name
- Xanthoparmelia rubromedulla Hale (1986)

Species of lichen

Xanthoparmelia rubromedulla is a species of saxicolous (rock-dwelling), foliose lichen in the family Parmeliaceae. Found in South Africa, it was formally described as a new species in 1986 by the American lichenologist Mason Hale. The type specimen was collected from Waaihoek Peak (Worcester Division, Cape Province) at an elevation of 1,680 m (5,510 ft), where it was found growing on a sandy rock face above a stream. The lichen thallus, which is loosely attached to its rock substrate, is light yellowish green and measures 5–10 cm (2–4 in) in diameter. It contains salazinic acid, usnic acid, and skyrin.

== See also ==
- List of Xanthoparmelia species
