= Hypotrachyna paracitrella =

Scientific classification
- Kingdom: Fungi
- Division: Ascomycota
- Class: Lecanoromycetes
- Order: Lecanorales
- Family: Parmeliaceae
- Genus: Hypotrachyna
- Species: H. paracitrella

Binomial name
- Hypotrachyna paracitrella Sipman (2011)
- Holotype: Llanganates National Park, Ecuador

Species of lichen

Hypotrachyna paracitrella is a rare species of foliose lichen in the family Parmeliaceae. Described in 2011 from a single specimen collected in Ecuador's Llanganates National Park, this lichen is distinguished by its lack of attachment structures (rhizines) on the underside of its thallus and its distinctive branching black hairs (cilia) along the margins. It forms small yellowish-green rosettes on tree branches in high-altitude dwarf forest at nearly 3,800 metres elevation and is known only from its original discovery site.

== Taxonomy ==
Hypotrachyna paracitrella was described in 2011 by Harrie Sipman and Zdeněk Palice from a single collection made high in Ecuador's Llanganates National Park. The epithet alludes to its similarity to H. citrella: both share yellow-tinged lobes and the same salazinic acid chemistry. The new species, however, entirely lacks rhizines (root-like holdfasts) and instead bears black marginal cilia that branch once to three times. These two features set it apart from H. citrella and from most members of Hypotrachyna, prompting the authors to suggest that rhizine-free, fork-ciliate species such as H. paracitrella, H. parasinuosa and H. paraphyscioides may warrant placement in a separate lineage when the polyphyletic genus is eventually split.

== Description ==
The lichen forms loose rosettes about 5 cm across on bark. Lobes are narrow and almost straight (2–3 mm wide), branching dichotomously and ending in blunt, slightly up-turned tips. The upper surface is greenish yellow, faintly shiny, rimmed in black and completely free of powdery or wart-like propagules. No soredia, isidia or lobules are produced. At, or just behind, the tips develop pale-yellow soralia whose granular soredia (roughly 60 μm) darken with age.

The lower surface is black, grading to pale brown at the lobe ends, but carries no rhizines. Instead, the margins sprout tree-like black cilia 1–2 mm long and up to 0.2 mm thick at the base, each forking at wide angles. Apothecia (fruiting bodies) are common: 2–5 mm wide, strongly stalked at the base, with shiny brown discs and crenulate, inward-curving rims; the ellipsoid spores measure 12–13 × 6–7 μm. Standard spot tests show KC+ (yellow) in the cortex (due to a trace of usnic acid) and a medulla that is K+ (yellow turning red) and P+ (orange-red), indicating salazinic acid with minor amounts of consalazinic, norstictic and protocetraric acids.

== Habitat and distribution ==
The species is only to occur in its type locality, a humid, dwarf forest on an east-facing slope at 3,750–3,800 m in the Cordillera Llanganates, Tungurahua Province, Ecuador. It grew on tree branches in bright light just below the páramo.
