= Xanthoparmelia namaquensis =

Scientific classification
- Kingdom: Fungi
- Division: Ascomycota
- Class: Lecanoromycetes
- Order: Lecanorales
- Family: Parmeliaceae
- Genus: Xanthoparmelia
- Species: X. namaquensis

Binomial name
- Xanthoparmelia namaquensis Hale (1986)

Species of lichen-forming fungus

Xanthoparmelia namaquensis is a species of saxicolous (rock-dwelling), foliose lichen in the family Parmeliaceae. Found in South Africa, it was formally described as a new species in 1986 by the American lichenologist Mason Hale. The type specimen was collected from Cape Province at an elevation of 800 m (2,600 ft), where it was growing on a sun-exposed sandstone cliff. The lichen, loosely attached to its rock substrate, has a yellowish-green thallus that darkens towards the center, and measures 6–12 cm (2.4–4.7 in) in diameter. It contains lecanoric acid and usnic acid, and an unnamed bright pinkish-orange anthraquinone pigment. The species epithet refers to Namaqualand, an arid region of southern Africa to which this species seems to be restricted.

== See also ==
- List of Xanthoparmelia species
