= Xanthoparmelia capensis =

Scientific classification
- Kingdom: Fungi
- Division: Ascomycota
- Class: Lecanoromycetes
- Order: Lecanorales
- Family: Parmeliaceae
- Genus: Xanthoparmelia
- Species: X. capensis

Binomial name
- Xanthoparmelia capensis Hale (1986)

Species of lichen-forming fungus

Xanthoparmelia capensis is a rare species of saxicolous (rock-dwelling), foliose lichen in the family Parmeliaceae. Found in southern Cape Province of South Africa, it was formally described as a new species in 1986 by the American lichenologist Mason Hale. The type specimen was collected about 27 km (17 mi) east of Swellendam (on the N2 highway), at an elevation of about 200 m (660 ft); there, it was found growing on low sandstone ledges in a pasture. The lichen is pale yellowish-green and reaches diameters of 4–6 cm (1.6–2.4 in) across, comprising somewhat irregular lobes that measure 1.2–2 mm. It contains salazinic acid and usnic acid.

== See also ==
- List of Xanthoparmelia species
