= Xanthoparmelia toninioides =

Scientific classification
- Kingdom: Fungi
- Division: Ascomycota
- Class: Lecanoromycetes
- Order: Lecanorales
- Family: Parmeliaceae
- Genus: Xanthoparmelia
- Species: X. toninioides

Binomial name
- Xanthoparmelia toninioides Hale (1986)

Species of lichen

Xanthoparmelia toninioides is a species of saxicolous (rock-dwelling), foliose lichen in the family Parmeliaceae. Found in South Africa, it was formally described as a new species in 1986 by the American lichenologist Mason Hale. The type specimen was collected about 1 km (0.6 mi) east of Springbok (Cape Province) at an elevation of 1,100 m (3,600 ft), where it was found growing on sloping granite domes in karoo vegetation. The lichen thallus, which is tightly attached to its rock substrate, measures 4–6 cm (1.6–2.4 in) broad and is light yellow green in color. It contains hypoprotocetraric acid, 4-O-demethylnotatic acid, and usnic acid.

== See also ==
- List of Xanthoparmelia species
