= Xanthoparmelia probarbellata =

Scientific classification
- Kingdom: Fungi
- Division: Ascomycota
- Class: Lecanoromycetes
- Order: Lecanorales
- Family: Parmeliaceae
- Genus: Xanthoparmelia
- Species: X. probarbellata

Binomial name
- Xanthoparmelia probarbellata Hale (1986)

Species of lichen

Xanthoparmelia probarbellata is a species of saxicolous (rock-dwelling), foliose lichen in the family Parmeliaceae. Found in South Africa, it was formally described as a new species in 1986 by the American lichenologist Mason Hale. The type specimen was collected from Cape Province at an elevation of 1,900 m (6,200 ft), where it was found growing in a pasture on soft conglomerate sandstone ridges. It has a yellowish-green thallus tightly attached to its rock substrate, measuring 4–6 cm (1.6–2.4 in) broad and comprising more or less linear lobes that are 2–3 mm wide. It contains salazinic acid, norstictic acid, usnic acid, and skyrin. The species epithet alludes to its resemblance to the Australian species Xanthoparmelia barbellata, which has a looser attachment to its substrate and also grows on soil.

== See also ==
- List of Xanthoparmelia species
