= Xanthoparmelia diacida =

Scientific classification
- Kingdom: Fungi
- Division: Ascomycota
- Class: Lecanoromycetes
- Order: Lecanorales
- Family: Parmeliaceae
- Genus: Xanthoparmelia
- Species: X. diacida

Binomial name
- Xanthoparmelia diacida Hale (1986)

Species of lichen-forming fungus

Xanthoparmelia diacida is a species of saxicolous (rock-dwelling), foliose lichen in the family Parmeliaceae. Found in Southern Africa, it was formally described as a new species in 1986 by the American lichenologist Mason Hale. The type specimen was collected from Cape Province at an elevation of about 800 m (2,600 ft), where it was found growing on a sandstone ridge in high veld. It has a bright yellow-green thallus that reaches 5–8 cm (2.0–3.1 in) in diameter, comprising somewhat irregularly shaped, imbricate (overlapping) lobes that are rotund and measure 2–4 mm wide. It contains psoromic acid, protocetraric acid, usnic acid, as well as an unidentified fatty acid and a set of compounds called the "schenckiana" pigments (referring to chemical similarity to Xanthoparmelia schenkiana).

== See also ==
- List of Xanthoparmelia species
