= Xanthoparmelia namakwa =

Scientific classification
- Kingdom: Fungi
- Division: Ascomycota
- Class: Lecanoromycetes
- Order: Lecanorales
- Family: Parmeliaceae
- Genus: Xanthoparmelia
- Species: X. namakwa

Binomial name
- Xanthoparmelia namakwa Hale (1986)

Species of lichen-forming fungus

Xanthoparmelia namakwa is a species of saxicolous (rock-dwelling), foliose lichen in the family Parmeliaceae. Found in South Africa, it was formally described as a new species in 1986 by the American lichenologist Mason Hale. The type specimen was collected from Cape Province at an elevation of 200 m (660 ft), where it was found growing on schist rock outcrops in flat pasture land. The lichen has a dark yellow-green thallus that is firm and leathery in texture, and measures 4–8 cm (1.6–3.1 in) broad. The species epithet refers to Namaqualand, a geographic area in which the type locality is situated. The lichen contains salazinic acid, norstictic acid, and usnic acid, and sometimes trace levels of other lichen substances.

== See also ==
- List of Xanthoparmelia species
