= Hypotrachyna angustissima =

Scientific classification
- Domain: Eukaryota
- Kingdom: Fungi
- Division: Ascomycota
- Class: Lecanoromycetes
- Order: Lecanorales
- Family: Parmeliaceae
- Genus: Hypotrachyna
- Species: H. angustissima

Binomial name
- Hypotrachyna angustissima Marcelli & Kalb (2002)

Species of fungus

Hypotrachyna angustissima is a species of foliose lichen in the family Parmeliaceae. This species is characterised by the occurrence of usnic acid in its cortex, and salazinic acid in its medulla and laminal isidia. In this it resembles Hypotrachyna microblasta, but the latter has wider laciniae and larger apothecia, and is laterally overlapping. Its epithet angustissima is derived from the Latin angusti, meaning "narrow", due to this species' very narrow laciniae.

== Description ==
It possesses a yellowish-green thallus that measures 4 to 7 centimetres (1.6 to 2.8 in) wide, its laciniae are plane and adnate. Its surface is continuous and somewhat irregularly cracked, being isodichotomously ramified. The species' axilla is oval, it counts with truncate apices, and a black-lined margin. It shows no lacinules nor soredia while showing weakly laminal maculae.

Its isidia are cylindrical with an irregular diameter, being between 0.2 and 0.8 mm high. Its medulla is white, while its underside is black, possessing a shiny and rugose, lighter margin. Its central surface is veined and papillate. Its rhizines measure between 0.2 to 0.6 millimetres (0.0079 to 0.0236 in) long, being coloured the same as the lower cortex and with a frequent distribution. Its apothecia is plane, with a diameter of 1.5 millimetres (0.059 in) and a crenate margin. It counts with 8 spores per ascus, which are ellipsoid. Pycnidia are absent in Hypotrachyna angustissima.

== Habitat ==
This species was first found in the Ibitipoca State Park, in Minas Gerais, on a rocky wall.
