= Xanthoparmelia neosynestia =

Scientific classification
- Kingdom: Fungi
- Division: Ascomycota
- Class: Lecanoromycetes
- Order: Lecanorales
- Family: Parmeliaceae
- Genus: Xanthoparmelia
- Species: X. neosynestia

Binomial name
- Xanthoparmelia neosynestia Hale (1986)

Species of lichen-forming fungus

Xanthoparmelia neosynestia is a species of saxicolous (rock-dwelling), foliose lichen in the family Parmeliaceae. Found in Southern Africa, it was formally described as a new species in 1986 by the American lichenologist Mason Hale. The type specimen was collected from Cape Province at an elevation of 800 m (2,600 ft), where it was found growing on sun-exposed sandstone cliffs in an escarpment among hillside karoo vegetation. The thallus of the lichen has a brittle texture and is dark greenish-yellow in color, reaching 4–7 cm (1.6–2.8 in) in diameter. It contains several secondary metabolites (lichen products): salazinic acid, consalazinic acid, usnic acid, and trace amounts of norstictic acid and protocetraric acid.

== See also ==
- List of Xanthoparmelia species
