= Xanthoparmelia endochromatica =

Scientific classification
- Kingdom: Fungi
- Division: Ascomycota
- Class: Lecanoromycetes
- Order: Lecanorales
- Family: Parmeliaceae
- Genus: Xanthoparmelia
- Species: X. endochromatica

Binomial name
- Xanthoparmelia endochromatica Hale (1986)

Species of lichen

Xanthoparmelia endochromatica is a species of saxicolous (rock-dwelling), foliose lichen in the family Parmeliaceae. Found in Southern Africa, it was formally described as a new species in 1986 by the American lichenologist Mason Hale. The type specimen was collected from the sandstone ledges of Table Mountain at an elevation of 950 m (3,120 ft). The thallus of this lichen is tightly attached to its rock substrate. It is yellowish-green, although older individuals tend to become blackened in the center, and reaches diameters of 1–2 cm (0.4–0.8 in). It contains gyrophoric acid, usnic acid, and a substance known as the "schenckiana" pigment.

== See also ==
- List of Xanthoparmelia species
