= Xanthoparmelia terricola =

Scientific classification
- Kingdom: Fungi
- Division: Ascomycota
- Class: Lecanoromycetes
- Order: Lecanorales
- Family: Parmeliaceae
- Genus: Xanthoparmelia
- Species: X. terricola

Binomial name
- Xanthoparmelia terricola Hale (1986)

Species of lichen

Xanthoparmelia terricola is a species of terricolous (ground-dwelling), foliose lichen in the family Parmeliaceae. Found in Southern Africa, it was formally described as a new species in 1986 by the American lichenologist Mason Hale. The type specimen was collected at the top of the Brandwagsrot in Golden Gate Highlands National Park at an elevation of 1,900 m (6,200 ft), where it was found growing on pebbles and soil in areas of flat sandstone exposures. The thallus of X. terricola, which grows tightly to loosely on its substrate, is yellowish green but darkens towards the center and measures 6–15 cm (2.4–5.9 in). It contains several lichen acids: salazinic, consalazinic acid, usnic, and trace amounts of norstictic and protocetraric acids.

== See also ==
- List of Xanthoparmelia species
