= Xanthoparmelia surrogata =

Scientific classification
- Kingdom: Fungi
- Division: Ascomycota
- Class: Lecanoromycetes
- Order: Lecanorales
- Family: Parmeliaceae
- Genus: Xanthoparmelia
- Species: X. surrogata

Binomial name
- Xanthoparmelia surrogata Hale (1986)

Species of lichen

Xanthoparmelia surrogata is a species of saxicolous (rock-dwelling), foliose lichen in the family Parmeliaceae. Found in South Africa, it was formally described as a new species in 1986 by the American lichenologist Mason Hale. The type specimen was collected by Hale from a large flat Table Mountain sandstone boulder in fynbos vegetation, at an elevation of 800 m (2,600 ft). The lichen thallus is dull yellowish green in color, has a leathery texture, and measures 6–10 cm (2.4–3.9 in) broad. Although it does not produce apothecia (fruiting bodies), pycnidia (asexual fruiting bodies) are common; these structures produce conidia (asexual spores) that have a bifusiform shape and measure 0.5 by 5–6 μm. The lichen contains salazinic acid, usnic acid, and skyrin.

== See also ==
- List of Xanthoparmelia species
