= Xanthoparmelia neotasmanica =

Scientific classification
- Kingdom: Fungi
- Division: Ascomycota
- Class: Lecanoromycetes
- Order: Lecanorales
- Family: Parmeliaceae
- Genus: Xanthoparmelia
- Species: X. neotasmanica

Binomial name
- Xanthoparmelia neotasmanica Hale (1986)

Species of lichen

Xanthoparmelia neotasmanica is a species of saxicolous (rock-dwelling), foliose lichen in the family Parmeliaceae. Found in Southern Africa, it was formally described as a new species in 1986 by the American lichenologist Mason Hale. The type specimen was collected from exfoliating granitic rock outcrops in karoo vegetation in Cape Province. The species epithet alludes to its resemblance to the common and more widespread species Xanthoparmelia tasmanica. It contains salazinic acid and usnic acid.

== See also ==
- List of Xanthoparmelia species
