= Xanthoparmelia skyrinifera =

Scientific classification
- Kingdom: Fungi
- Division: Ascomycota
- Class: Lecanoromycetes
- Order: Lecanorales
- Family: Parmeliaceae
- Genus: Xanthoparmelia
- Species: X. skyrinifera

Binomial name
- Xanthoparmelia skyrinifera Hale (1986)

Species of lichen

Xanthoparmelia skyrinifera is a species of saxicolous (rock-dwelling), foliose lichen in the family Parmeliaceae. Found in Southern Africa, it was formally described as a new species in 1986 by the American lichenologist Mason Hale. The type specimen was collected from Cape Province at an elevation of about 500 m (1,600 ft), where it was found growing in a pasture on schist rocks. The lichen thallus, which is loosely attached to its substrate, is bright yellowish green in color and measures 6–12 cm (2.4–4.7 in) in diameter. Although it lacks apothecia (fruiting bodies), it produces numerous pycnidia (asexual fruiting structures) that make conidia (asexual spores) that have a bifusiform shape and measure 0.5 by 5–6 μm. The lichen makes protocetraric acid, usnic acid, and skyrin; it is named for this later substance.

== See also ==
- List of Xanthoparmelia species
