= Xanthoparmelia ceresensis =

Scientific classification
- Kingdom: Fungi
- Division: Ascomycota
- Class: Lecanoromycetes
- Order: Lecanorales
- Family: Parmeliaceae
- Genus: Xanthoparmelia
- Species: X. ceresensis

Binomial name
- Xanthoparmelia ceresensis Hale (1986)

Species of lichen-forming fungus

Xanthoparmelia ceresensis is a little-known species of saxicolous (rock-dwelling), foliose lichen in the family Parmeliaceae. Found in Southern Africa, it was formally described as a new species in 1986 by the American lichenologist Mason Hale. The type specimen was collected from Michell Pass in the Ceres Nature Reserve at an elevation of about 600 m (2,000 ft); there, it was found growing on low sandstone ledges. The lichen contains equal amounts of microphyllinic acid and normicrophyllinic acid, usnic acid, and trace amounts of 4-O-methylolivetoric acid.

== See also ==
- List of Xanthoparmelia species
