= Xanthoparmelia thamnolica =

Scientific classification
- Kingdom: Fungi
- Division: Ascomycota
- Class: Lecanoromycetes
- Order: Lecanorales
- Family: Parmeliaceae
- Genus: Xanthoparmelia
- Species: X. thamnolica

Binomial name
- Xanthoparmelia thamnolica Hale (1986)

Species of lichen

Xanthoparmelia thamnolica is a species of saxicolous (rock-dwelling), foliose lichen in the family Parmeliaceae. Found in Southern Africa, it was formally described as a new species in 1986 by the American lichenologist Mason Hale. The type specimen was collected from Cape Province at an elevation of about 300 m (980 ft), where it was found in a pasture growing on sandstone boulders. The thallus is dark yellowish green in colour and measures 5–8 cm (2.0–3.1 in). It contains thamnolic acid (for which the species is named) and usnic acid.

== See also ==
- List of Xanthoparmelia species
