= Xanthoparmelia curnowiae =

Scientific classification
- Kingdom: Fungi
- Division: Ascomycota
- Class: Lecanoromycetes
- Order: Lecanorales
- Family: Parmeliaceae
- Genus: Xanthoparmelia
- Species: X. curnowiae

Binomial name
- Xanthoparmelia curnowiae Elix (2006)
- Holotype: lookout between Koolyanobbing township and Dowd Hill, Western Australia

Species of foliose lichen

Xanthoparmelia curnowiae is a species of foliose lichen in the family Parmeliaceae. Endemic to Western Australia, it grows on dead wood in Eucalyptus woodlands among ironstone outcrops and is known only from its type locality. The lichen features a yellow-green thallus (up to 4 cm wide) with overlapping lobes that are closely attached to its substrate, moderate to dense isidia, and a pale brown lower surface with sparse dark brown rhizines. It is chemically characterised by the presence of usnic acid, atranorin, salazinic acid, and diffractaic acid, which produce distinctive colour reactions in chemical spot tests.

== Taxonomy ==
Xanthoparmelia curnowiae was described by John Elix in 2006, from specimens collected from the lookout between Koolyanobbing township and Dowd Hill in Western Australia, at an elevation of 390 m (1,280 ft). The species name honours the Australian bryologist Judith Curnow, recognizing her contributions to the field.

== Description ==
The thallus of Xanthoparmelia curnowiae is closely attached to its substrate (adnate), reaching up to 4 cm in width. It features contiguous to imbricate (overlapping) lobes that are somewhat linear to irregularly shaped and measure 1–2 mm wide. The lobes often have rotund, monophyllous lobules. The upper surface is yellow-green, shiny initially but becomes dull with age, and is emaculate. Isidia are moderate to dense, starting out more or less spherical (globose) and becoming somewhat cylindrical, without inflating at the tips.

The medulla is white, while the lower surface is smooth, pale brown darkening towards the tips, with sparse, simple, dark brown rhizines. Chemical spot tests on the cortex yield a pale yellow reaction with potassium hydroxide solution (K), and the medulla reacts yellow then dark red with K, indicating the presence of usnic acid, atranorin, salazinic acid, diffractaic acid, and traces of consalazinic acid.

== Habitat and distribution ==
Xanthoparmelia curnowiae is found in Eucalyptus woodlands among ironstone rock outcrops. It grows on dead wood and is only known from its type locality in Western Australia.

== See also ==
- List of Xanthoparmelia species
