= Xanthoparmelia crassilobata =

Scientific classification
- Kingdom: Fungi
- Division: Ascomycota
- Class: Lecanoromycetes
- Order: Lecanorales
- Family: Parmeliaceae
- Genus: Xanthoparmelia
- Species: X. crassilobata

Binomial name
- Xanthoparmelia crassilobata Hale (1986)

Species of lichen-forming fungus

Xanthoparmelia crassilobata is a species of terricolous (soil-dwelling), foliose lichen in the family Parmeliaceae. Found in South Africa, it was formally described as a new species in 1986 by the American lichenologist Mason Hale. The type specimen was collected from Cape Province at an elevation of 1,500 m (4,900 ft), where it was found growing on soil on flat dolerite outcrops in a pasture. The lichen has a leathery and bright yellowish-green thallus, measuring 4–8 cm (1.6–3.1 in) in diameter, that grows with a loosely adnate attachment to its substrate of soil and loose pebbles. It contains salazinic acid and usnic acid.

== See also ==
- List of Xanthoparmelia species
