= Hypotrachyna neosingularis =

Scientific classification
- Kingdom: Fungi
- Division: Ascomycota
- Class: Lecanoromycetes
- Order: Lecanorales
- Family: Parmeliaceae
- Genus: Hypotrachyna
- Species: H. neosingularis

Binomial name
- Hypotrachyna neosingularis Divakar, Upreti & Elix (2001)

Species of lichen

Hypotrachyna neosingularis is a species of corticolous (bark-dwelling) foliose lichen in the family Parmeliaceae. Described as a new species in 2001, it is found in India, where it is endemic to the Eastern Himalaya.

== Taxonomy ==
Hypotrachyna neosingularis was formally described as a new species by the lichenologists Pradeep Divakar, Dalip Kumar Upreti, and John Elix as part of a survey of collections of the family Parmeliaceae from India. The type specimen was collected in Gangtok, Sikkim, at an unspecified elevation, growing on bark. It was collected by K.P. Srivastava in July 1959, and is housed in the lichen herbarium at LWG (National Botanical Research Institute, Lucknow, India). The species name neosingularis refers to its close relationship with Hypotrachyna singularis, a South American species described by Mason Hale in 1975. The Indian species is distinguished from H. singularis primarily by the shape of its lobules (rounded in H. neosingularis versus narrow and strap-shaped in H. singularis), its smaller spores, and differences in the chemistry of its medulla.

== Description ==
Hypotrachyna neosingularis has foliose (leafy) thallus that grows up to 8 cm wide. The thallus is loosely adnate to adnate (attached somewhat loosely to moderately firmly to its substrate) and has a coriaceous (leathery) texture. Its lobes are imbricate (overlapping like roof tiles), sublinear to irregular in shape, and measure 3–5 mm in width. The margins are eciliate (lacking hair-like structures) and lobulate (having small lobe-like structures). These lobules are rounded, can be found both along margins and on the surface, and are dense in the centre of the thallus, measuring 0.2–1.0 mm wide.

The upper surface is grey, becoming grey-brown with age, and can be flat or buckled. It is smooth, shiny, and emaculate (without spots) but may develop irregular cracks over time. The species lacks isidia, soredia, and pustules (various forms of vegetative reproductive structures), suggesting it reproduces primarily through spores. The medulla (inner layer) is white. The lower surface is black to the margin with moderately dense, dichotomously branched black rhizines (root-like structures), which measure 1.0–2.5 mm wide.

Apothecia (cup-like fruiting bodies) are common and sessile (attached directly without a stalk), measuring 1.0–2.5 mm wide. They are shallowly concave, pale brown to black, with the thalline exciple (rim-like structure) smooth and margin involute (rolled inward) at first, later becoming dentate (toothed). The ascospores (spores produced in the apothecia) are ellipsoid and measure 8–9 by 4.5–5.5 μm. Pycnidia (flask-shaped structures producing asexual spores) are black and immersed in the thallus. The conidia (asexual spores) are weakly bifusiform (spindle-shaped) and measure 6–8 by 1 μm.

=== Chemistry ===
The chemistry of H. neosingularis is characterised by distinctive chemical spot tests reactions and specific secondary metabolites. The cortex is K+ (yellow), while the medulla shows K−, C−, KC−, P− reactions (no colour change with these reagents). The lichen contains several secondary metabolites: atranorin (major), chloroatranorin (minor), lichesterinic acid (major), and protolichesterinic acid (trace), along with an unknown fatty acid (minor). This chemical profile differs significantly from the related species Hypotrachyna singularis, which contains dehydroprotoconstipitatic acid (major), praesorediosic acid (major), protoconstipatic acid (minor), constipatic acid (minor), praesorediosic acid (minor), lichesterinic acid (major), protolichesterinic acid (trace), and an unknown fatty acid (minor). The presence of lichesterinic acid as a major component in H. neosingularis, compared to the complex mixture of fatty acids in H. singularis, serves as an important chemical marker for distinguishing between these morphologically similar species.

== Habitat and distribution ==
At the time of its description in 2001, Hypotrachyna neosingularis was known only from its type locality in Sikkim, India. The discovery of the species was part of a broader effort to document the lichen funga of the Indian subcontinent, which had been investigated intensively over the preceding 40 years by researchers such as Awasthi. H. neosingularis was reported from Mizoram (North East India) in 2020. The species is considered endemic to the Eastern Himalaya.
