= Xanthoparmelia minuta =

Scientific classification
- Kingdom: Fungi
- Division: Ascomycota
- Class: Lecanoromycetes
- Order: Lecanorales
- Family: Parmeliaceae
- Genus: Xanthoparmelia
- Species: X. minuta

Binomial name
- Xanthoparmelia minuta M.D.E.Knox & Hale (1986)

Species of lichen-forming fungus

Xanthoparmelia minuta is a species of saxicolous (rock-dwelling), foliose lichen in the family Parmeliaceae. Found in South Africa, it was formally described as a new species in 1986 by David Knox and Mason Hale. The type specimen was collected from Pilgrim's Rest in the Mount Sheba Nature Reserve at an elevation of about 1,965 m (6,447 ft); there, it was found growing on open sandstone cliffs. Tightly attached to its rock substrate, the thallus of X. minuta is yellowish green in color and measures 1–1.5 cm (0.4–0.6 in) broad. It contains norstictic acid, salazinic acid, consalazinic acid, usnic acid, and trace amounts of pyrophoric acid and protoconstipatic acid.

== See also ==
- List of Xanthoparmelia species
