= Hypotrachyna andensis =

Scientific classification
- Kingdom: Fungi
- Division: Ascomycota
- Class: Lecanoromycetes
- Order: Lecanorales
- Family: Parmeliaceae
- Genus: Hypotrachyna
- Species: H. andensis

Binomial name
- Hypotrachyna andensis Hale (1975)

Species of lichen

Hypotrachyna andensis is a species of foliose lichen in the family Parmeliaceae. It is known to occur in the Neotropics and in Papua New Guinea.
