= (S)-usnate reductase =

Class of enzymes

Identifiers
- EC no.: 1.1.1.199
- CAS no.: 77237-99-1

Databases
- IntEnz: IntEnz view
- BRENDA: BRENDA entry
- ExPASy: NiceZyme view
- KEGG: KEGG entry
- MetaCyc: metabolic pathway
- PRIAM: profile
- PDB structures: RCSB PDB PDBe PDBsum
- Gene Ontology: AmiGO / QuickGO
Search
- PMC: articles
- PubMed: articles
- NCBI: proteins

In enzymology, (S)-usnate reductase (EC 1.1.1.199) is an enzyme that catalyzes the chemical reaction

(S)-usnic acid precursor
+ NAD^{+}
H^{+}
H^{+}
(S)-usnic acid
+ NADH

The enzyme converts the precursor (6R)-2-acetyl-6-(3-acetyl-2,4,6-trihydroxy-5-methylphenyl)-3-hydroxy-6-methylcyclohexa-2,4-dien-1-one into (S)-usnic acid using oxidised nicotinamide adenine dinucleotide (NAD^{+}) as cofactor and forming an ether bond.

This enzyme belongs to the family of oxidoreductases, specifically those acting on the CH-OH group of donor with NAD^{+} or NADP^{+} as acceptor. The systematic name of this enzyme class is reduced-(S)-usnate:NAD^{+} oxidoreductase (ether-bond-forming). This enzyme is also called L-usnic acid dehydrogenase.
