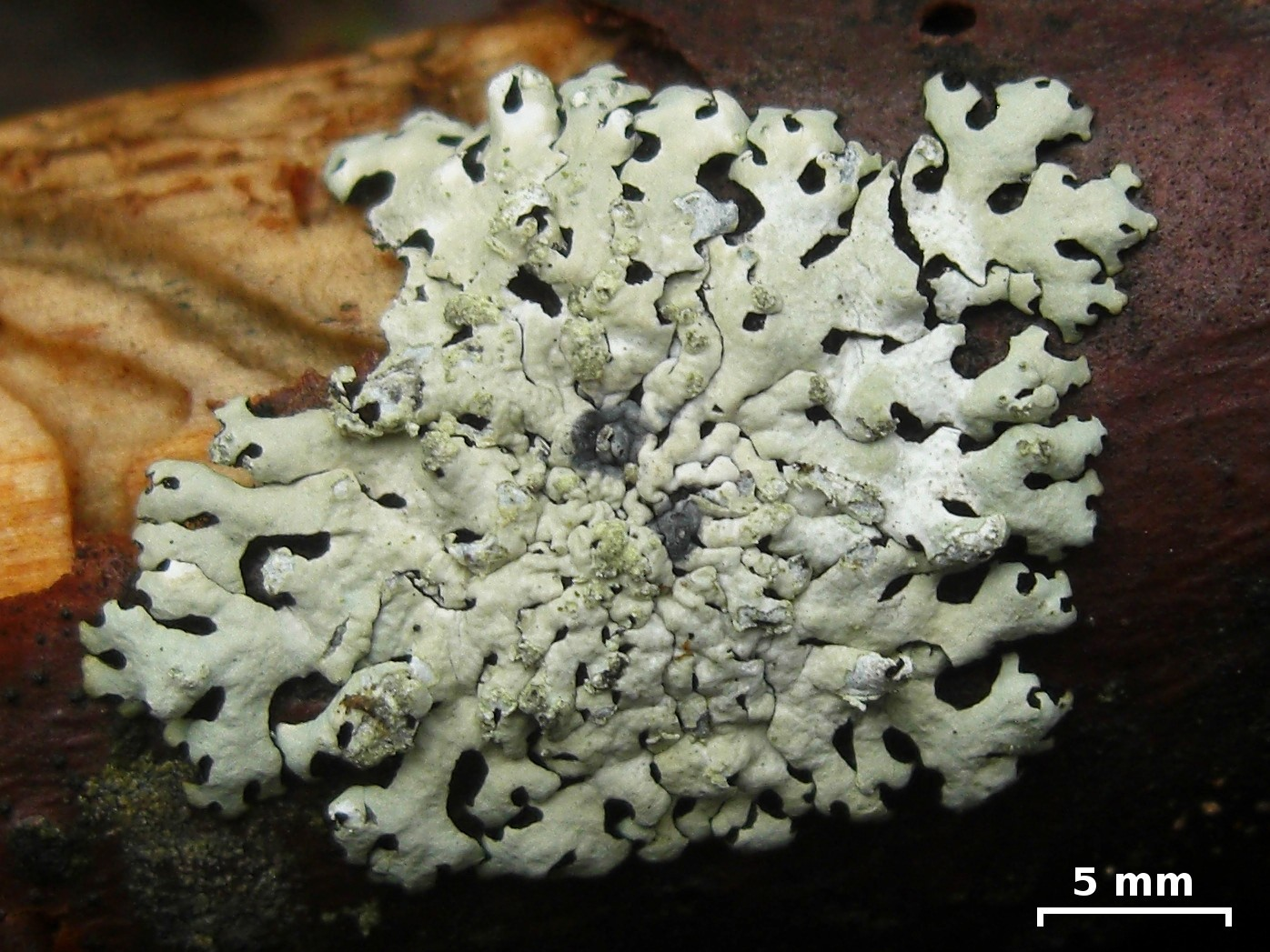

Conservation status
- Apparently Secure (NatureServe)

Scientific classification
- Kingdom: Fungi
- Division: Ascomycota
- Class: Lecanoromycetes
- Order: Lecanorales
- Family: Parmeliaceae
- Genus: Hypotrachyna
- Species: H. osseoalba

Binomial name
- Hypotrachyna osseoalba (Vain.) Y.S.Park & Hale (1989)

Synonyms
- Parmelia osseoalba Vain. (1921); Parmelia formosana Zahlbr. (1933); Hypotrachyna formosana (Zahlbr.) Hale (1975)

= Hypotrachyna osseoalba =

Species of lichen-forming fungus

Hypotrachyna osseoalba, commonly known as the grainy loop lichen, is a species of foliose lichen in the family Parmeliaceae. It is widely distributed in subtropical and temperate areas of the world. Characteristic features of the lichen include the pustules in its cortex, the somewhat linear shape of the lobes comprising the thallus, and the branched rhizines (holdfasts on the thallus underside).

== Taxonomy ==
It was first scientifically described by Finnish lichenologist Edvard Vainio in 1921, as Parmelia osseoalba. Yun Sil Park and Mason Hale transferred it to the genus Hypotrachyna in 1989.

The taxon Parmelia formosana, described by Alexander Zahlbruckner in 1934, later became Hypotrachyna formosana after Hale transferred it to Hypotrachyna in 1975. When Hale was later working on a monograph of genus Xanthoparmelia, he studied the type material of Vainio's Parmelia osseoalba, and determined that it was identical both chemically and morphologically to Hypotrachyna formosana. Because of this, the name used by Zahlbruckner became a later synonym of Vainio's name.

In North America, Hypotrachyna osseoalba is commonly known as the "grainy loop lichen".

== Chemistry ==
Several secondary compounds are known to occur in Hypotrachyna osseoalba, including colensoinic acid, norcolensoic acid, physodic acid, lividic acid, 4-O-demethylphysodic acid, oxyphysodic acid, and lichexanthone.

== Distribution ==
Hypotrachyna osseoalba occurs in subtropical and temperate areas of Asia (South Korea, Japan, Taiwan, and Thailand) Australia, Africa, Central America, South America, and the eastern United States. In Nepal, Hypotrachyna osseoalba has been reported from 1,100 to 2,200 m elevation in a compilation of published records.
