= Hypotrachyna boquetensis =

Scientific classification
- Kingdom: Fungi
- Division: Ascomycota
- Class: Lecanoromycetes
- Order: Lecanorales
- Family: Parmeliaceae
- Genus: Hypotrachyna
- Species: H. boquetensis

Binomial name
- Hypotrachyna boquetensis (Hale) Hale (1975)

Synonyms
- Parmelia boquetensis Hale (1974)

Species of lichen

Hypotrachyna boquetensis is a species of foliose lichen in the family Parmeliaceae. It was first described scientifically by lichenologist Mason Hale as a member of the genus Parmelia; he transferred it to the genus Hypotrachyna a year later. It is found in the mountains of Central and northern South America, where it grows on hardwood trunks and branches at elevations of 1,400–2,800 m (4,600–9,200 ft). It has also been recorded from India.
