= Hypotrachyna bogotensis =

Scientific classification
- Kingdom: Fungi
- Division: Ascomycota
- Class: Lecanoromycetes
- Order: Lecanorales
- Family: Parmeliaceae
- Genus: Hypotrachyna
- Species: H. bogotensis

Binomial name
- Hypotrachyna bogotensis (Vain.) Hale (1975)

Species of lichen

Hypotrachyna bogotensis is a species of foliose lichen in the family Parmeliaceae. It was first described scientifically by Finnish lichenologist Edvard August Vainio. Mason Hale transferred it to the genus Hypotrachyna in 1975. It is a common species in the high mountains of the Central America and the northern Andes. It has also been recorded from southern Chile and from Gough Island.
