= Cora casanarensis =

Scientific classification
- Kingdom: Fungi
- Division: Basidiomycota
- Class: Agaricomycetes
- Order: Agaricales
- Family: Hygrophoraceae
- Genus: Cora
- Species: C. casanarensis

Binomial name
- Cora casanarensis L.Vargas, Moncada & Lücking (2014)

Species of lichen

Cora casanarensis is a rare species of basidiolichen in the family Hygrophoraceae. It is found in Colombia. This distinctive lichen forms neat, leaf-like rosettes up to 8 cm across that grow directly on bare rock, with five to eight broad lobes that change from dark grey-brown when wet to pale grey-white when dry. Described as new to science in 2014 from a single location in Casanare Department at 1400 metres elevation, it is known only from its type locality where it grows alongside mosses and other lichen species.

== Taxonomy ==
The lichen was formally described as a new species in 2014 by Leidy Yasmín Vargas, Bibiana Moncada, and Robert Lücking. The type specimen was collected in Finca El Paraiso (Vereda Centro Sur, Chámeza) at an altitude of 1,400 m (4,600 ft). The lichen is only known to occur at the type locality, where it grows on rocks, often associated with bryophytes and with lichens from genus Hypotrachyna. The specific epithet refers to Casanare, the central eastern Colombian department that contains the type locality. Phylogenetically, the closest species to Cora casanarensis are C. strigosa, found in Peru, C. timucua (Florida), and C. itabaiana (Brazil).

== Description ==
Cora casanarensis forms neat, leaf-like rosettes that sit directly on bare rock or nestle between moss cushions. Each rosette (the thallus) is usually no more than 8 cm across and is built from five to eight broad, semicircular lobes. Individual lobes measure 1–4 cm in both width and length and fork once or twice, the forks separated at the base by fine "sutures" that look rather like seams in cloth. When moist the upper surface is a dark grey-brown to olive-grey, while in the herbarium it dries to a pale grey-white. It is smooth but marked by broad, shallow concentric ridges. Along the sutures the margin is irregularly notched, and the narrow zones hidden between adjoining branches are slightly woolly (tomentose). The lower surface is plain white, regardless of whether the lichen is fresh or dry.

A thin vertical slice of a lobe reveals three main layers packed into a total thickness of about 0.2–0.3 mm. Uppermost is the cortex (80–100 μm thick), a protective "skin" of fungal threads (hyphae) arranged first parallel to the surface (periclinal) and then, in a second sub-layer, more or less perpendicular (anticlinal). Beneath this lies the photobiont layer (70–100 μm). Here the partner cyanobacteria occur in tight spherical clusters 15–25 μm wide; each cell is 10–15 μm across and yellow-green in colour. Every cluster is wrapped in a jigsaw-like sheath of fungal cells, and loose fungal hyphae 2–4 μm wide weave through the zone. The innermost medulla (60–80 μm) consists of rather loosely packed hyphae that mostly run parallel to the surface but turn here and there in an irregular mesh. No hymenophore—that is, no fertile, spore-producing layer—has yet been observed in available material, and thin-layer chromatography detects no characteristic lichen products.
