= Hypotrachyna aspera =

Scientific classification
- Kingdom: Fungi
- Division: Ascomycota
- Class: Lecanoromycetes
- Order: Lecanorales
- Family: Parmeliaceae
- Genus: Hypotrachyna
- Species: H. aspera

Binomial name
- Hypotrachyna aspera C.H.Ribeiro & Marcelli (2002)

Species of lichen

Hypotrachyna aspera is a species of foliose lichen in the family Parmeliaceae. The lichen forms loose, whitish rosettes with very narrow, finely divided lobes that give it a frilled appearance. It reproduces through small blisters on its surface that burst to release powdery granules containing both fungal and algal cells. Originally discovered in 2002 in the mountains of southeastern Brazil, it grows on acidic rocks in humid, partially shaded areas where moist forest meets open woodland. The species has since been found in several other Latin American countries, including Argentina, Bolivia, and Guatemala.

== Taxonomy ==
Hypotrachyna aspera was formally described in 2002 by Célio H. Ribeiro and Marcelo Marcelli during their survey of the mountainous Atlantic Forest–cerrado mosaic in south-eastern Brazil. The authors placed it in the large parmelioid family Parmeliaceae, within the genus Hypotrachyna—a group characterised by foliose (leaf-like) thalli with a black lower cortex and diverse secondary metabolites. The type specimen was collected on quartzitic rock at the margin of the Tanque Grande reservoir in the Serra do Caraça, Minas Gerais, about 1100 m elevation.

Chemically the species is distinguished by the presence of atranorin in the cortex and alectoronic acid in the medulla, a combination otherwise uncommon in the genus. These substances, together with the non-reactive (UV–) cortex and the medullary K+ (rose) reaction, helped the original authors delimit the taxon from similar pustulate species such as H. brueggeri and H. dactylifera.

== Description ==
The thallus forms loose, rather ragged rosettes 4–6 cm (1.6–2.4 in) across. Its upper surface is a dull white that may weather to pale grey; individual lobes (laciniae) are very narrow—only 1.0–2.5 mm wide—giving the thallus a finely frilled appearance. These lobes are more or less flat to slightly up-turned, have truncate (squared-off) tips and carry a thin black marginal line that accentuates each division. Pustulae, blister-like swellings that rise from the surface, develop mainly near the lobe edges; they soon burst to release a coarse, grainy powder of soredia (minute balls of algal and fungal cells used for vegetative reproduction). Unlike the closely related species mentioned above, the pustules here lack any K-reactive yellow pigment, remaining whitish even after reagent is applied.

Internally, the medulla (the loose cottony layer inside the thallus) is white, reacting K+ (rose) because of alectoronic acid. The lower surface is jet black, shiny and wrinkled toward the centre but becomes chestnut brown near the margin. Attachment to the substrate is achieved by numerous forked rhizines—root-like fibres—0.3–0.8 mm long that are the same colour as the lower cortex. No apothecia (sexual fruit-bodies) were seen, and pycnidia (minute flask-shaped asexual organs) were likewise absent in the type series.

== Habitat and distribution ==
Hypotrachyna aspera was originally described from collections made in the Serra do Caraça massif (Minas Gerais) in south-eastern Brazil. All material was collected between 1,100 and 1,150 m (3,610 and 3,770 ft) on acid siliceous rock bordering the Tanque Grande reservoir—a setting where moist montane forest intergrades with open candeia (Eremanthus erythropappus) woodland. Here the lichen grows in partially shaded, rain-washed situations where fog is frequent and the air remains humid for much of the year. It has subsequently been reported from Argentina, Bolivia, and Guatemala.
