= Hypotrachyna lueckingii =

Scientific classification
- Kingdom: Fungi
- Division: Ascomycota
- Class: Lecanoromycetes
- Order: Lecanorales
- Family: Parmeliaceae
- Genus: Hypotrachyna
- Species: H. lueckingii

Binomial name
- Hypotrachyna lueckingii Sipman (2011)

Species of lichen

Hypotrachyna lueckingii is a species of corticolous (bark-dwelling), foliose lichen in the family Parmeliaceae. It is only known to occur at high elevations on the Cordillera de Talamanca in Costa Rica.

== Taxonomy ==
The lichen was described as new to science in 2011 by the Dutch lichenologist Harrie Sipman. The type specimen was collected from Cerro de la Asunción (Cerro de la Muerte, Cordillera de Talamanca, Cartago, Costa Rica) at an elevation of 3,350 m (10,990 ft), where it was found growing on shrub branches in shrubland similar to páramo. The species epithet honours the German lichenologist Robert Lücking for his contributions to the knowledge of the lichen flora in Costa Rica.

== Description ==
Hypotrachyna lueckingii is a foliose (leafy) lichen that grows on tree bark. The thallus, or body of the lichen, spans 5–10 cm (2.0–3.9 in) in width and is loosely attached to its substrate, not having a leathery texture. Its lobes are either linear or slightly irregular and mostly separate from one another, measuring 0.5 to 3 mm wide. These lobes are flat to slightly convex with blunt tips.

The upper surface of the thallus is greenish-yellow and slightly shiny, without any powdery coating (epruinose) or distinct spots (immaculate). It lacks reproductive structures like soredia, isidia, pustules, dactyls, or lobules, and its upper cortex remains intact. Beneath this upper layer, the medulla is white and contains a continuous layer of symbiotic green algae. The lower surface of the thallus is black with a dark brown edge. The rhizines (root-like structures that attach the lichen to the substrate) are black and fairly dense, sometimes forming a fringe around the edges. These rhizines are about 0.5 mm long and are branched in a forked manner.

Hypotrachyna lueckingii frequently produces apothecia (fruiting bodies) measuring 2–7 mm in diameter. The apothecia have concave to flat, brown, glossy discs with crenulated (scalloped) and incurved (curved inward) margins. The lichen's spores are ellipsoid, measuring 10–13 μm in length and 6–7 μm in width. Pycnidia, which are asexual reproductive structures, are common and located on the surface of the thallus. They are immersed in the thallus and produce weakly spindle-shaped conidia (asexual spores) about 6 μm long and 0.5 μm wide.

In terms of chemistry, the upper cortex of the lichen reacts to chemical spot tests as follows: it is K−, C−, and UV−, but KC+ (yellow). The medulla reacts negatively to K−, C−, and UV−, but is P+ (orange-red). The main secondary metabolites (lichen products) found in the upper cortex are usnic acid, while the medulla contains protocetraric acid and gyrophoric acid as major and minor components, respectively.
