= Hypotrachyna brevirhiza =

Scientific classification
- Kingdom: Fungi
- Division: Ascomycota
- Class: Lecanoromycetes
- Order: Lecanorales
- Family: Parmeliaceae
- Genus: Hypotrachyna
- Species: H. brevirhiza

Binomial name
- Hypotrachyna brevirhiza (Kurok.) Hale (1975)

Synonyms
- Parmelia brevirhiza Kurok. (1964)

Species of lichen

Hypotrachyna brevirhiza is a species of foliose lichen in the family Parmeliaceae. First described as a species of Parmelia by Syo Kurokawa in 1964, Mason Hale transferred it to the genus Hypotrachyna in 1975. The lichen is widespread in Central American Mountains and in the Andes at elevations of 2,700–4,300 m (8,900–14,100 ft), where it grows as an epiphyte on exposed trees and shrubs. It also occurs in southern South America, Africa, India, Indonesia, Papua New Guinea, Macquarie Island, and the Pacific.
