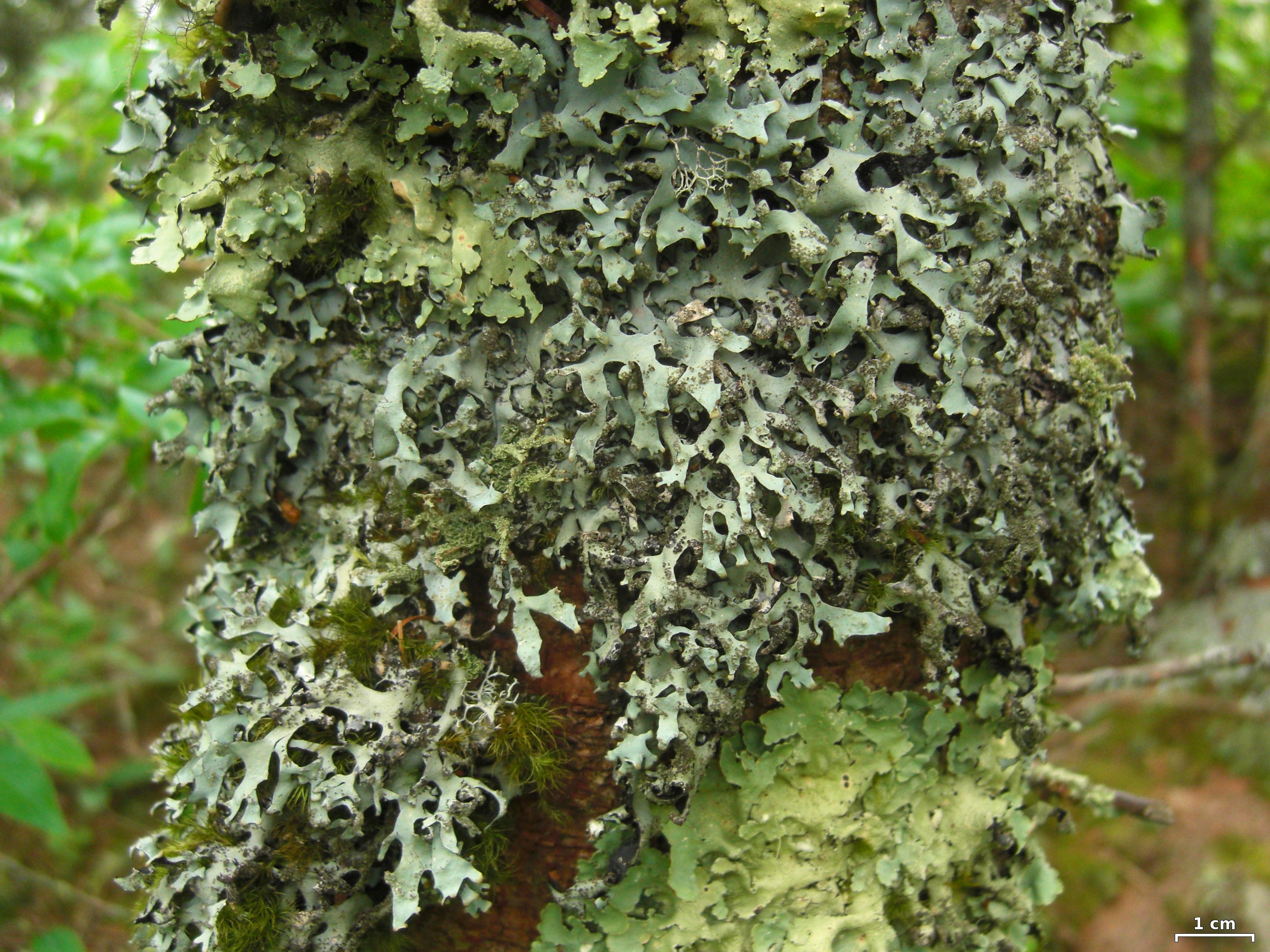

Conservation status
- Secure (NatureServe)

Scientific classification
- Kingdom: Fungi
- Division: Ascomycota
- Class: Lecanoromycetes
- Order: Lecanorales
- Family: Parmeliaceae
- Genus: Hypotrachyna
- Species: H. revoluta

Binomial name
- Hypotrachyna revoluta (Flörke) Hale (1975)

Synonyms
- Parmelia revoluta Flörke (1815) (basionym)

= Hypotrachyna revoluta =

Species of lichen-forming fungus

Hypotrachyna revoluta is a species of lichen-forming fungus belonging to the family Parmeliaceae.

It has cosmopolitan distribution. In Nepal, Hypotrachyna revoluta has been reported from 2,000 to 2,250 m elevation in a compilation of published records.
