= Hypotrachyna brasiliana =

Scientific classification
- Kingdom: Fungi
- Division: Ascomycota
- Class: Lecanoromycetes
- Order: Lecanorales
- Family: Parmeliaceae
- Genus: Hypotrachyna
- Species: H. brasiliana

Binomial name
- Hypotrachyna brasiliana (Nyl.) Hale (1974)

Synonyms
- Parmelia brasiliana Nyl. (1885)

Species of lichen

Hypotrachyna brasiliana is a species of foliose lichen in the family Parmeliaceae. It was originally described by William Nylander in 1885 as a species of Parmelia. Mason Hale transferred it to the new genus Hypotrachyna in 1975. The lichen is found in the mountains of southeastern Brazil at elevations of 800–2,400 m (2,600–7,900 ft), where it grows on siliceous rocks, or on mosses over rocks.
