= Thamnea ustulata =

Scientific classification
- Kingdom: Plantae
- Clade: Tracheophytes
- Clade: Angiosperms
- Clade: Eudicots
- Clade: Asterids
- Order: Bruniales
- Family: Bruniaceae
- Genus: Thamnea
- Species: T. ustulata

Binomial name
- Thamnea ustulata (Thunb.) A.V.Hall

Synonyms
- Diosma ustulata Thunb.; Thamnea diosmoides Oliv.

Species of flowering plant

Thamnea ustulata is a perennial, flowering shrub that is part of the Bruniaceae family. The species is endemic to the Western Cape and occurs from the Cederberg to the Waaihoek Mountains.
