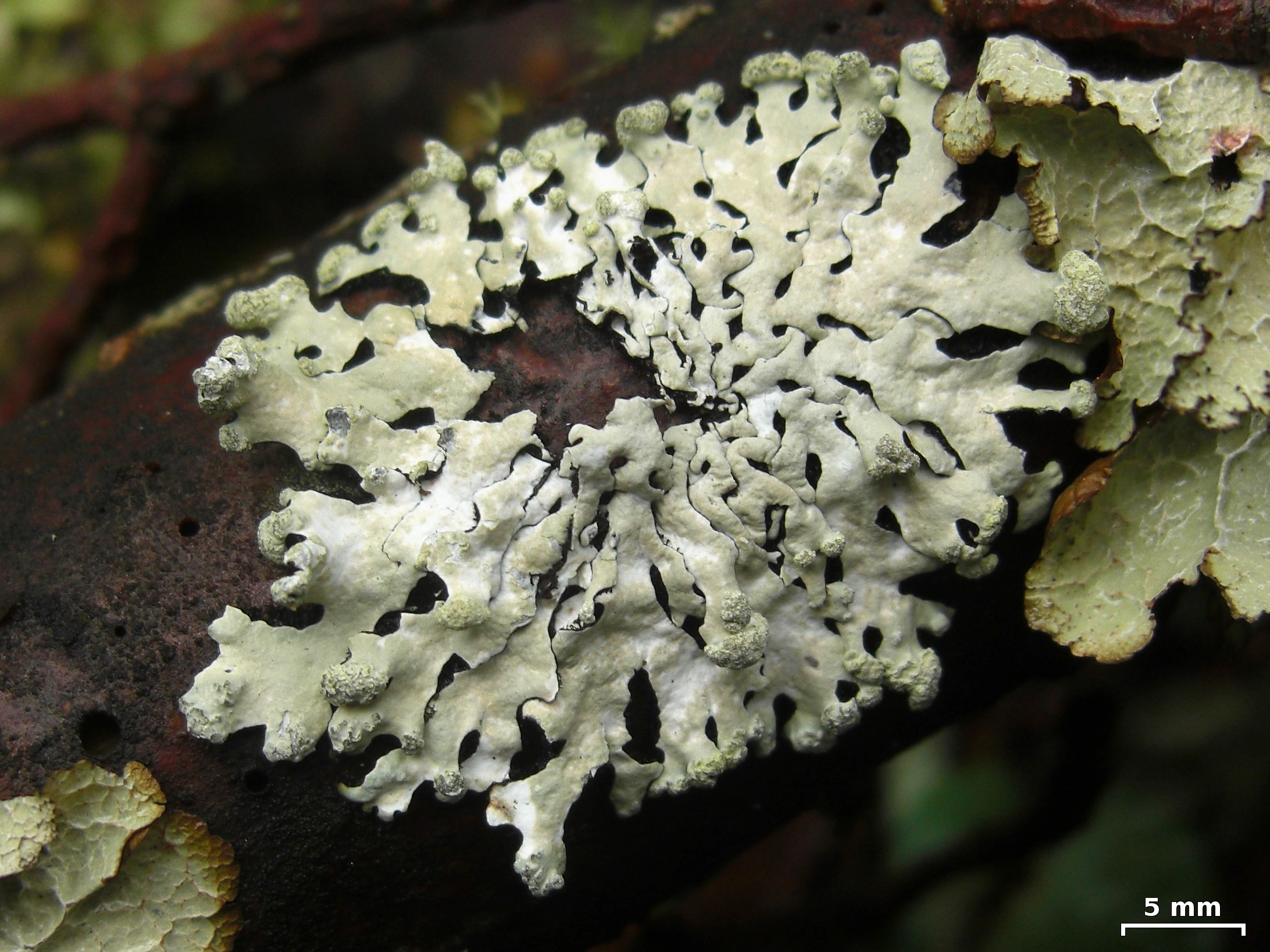

Scientific classification
- Domain: Eukaryota
- Kingdom: Fungi
- Division: Ascomycota
- Class: Lecanoromycetes
- Order: Lecanorales
- Family: Parmeliaceae
- Genus: Hypotrachyna
- Species: H. taylorensis

Binomial name
- Hypotrachyna taylorensis (M.E.Mitchell) Hale (1975)

Synonyms
- Parmelia rugosa Taylor (1836); Parmelia revoluta f. rugosa (Taylor (1936); Parmelia taylorensis M.E.Mitchell (1961)

= Hypotrachyna taylorensis =

Species of lichen

Hypotrachyna taylorensis is a species of foliose lichen in the family Parmeliaceae. It was described by the Irish lichenologist Michael Edward Mitchell in 1961, and transferred to genus Hypotrachyna by Mason Hale in 1975.

The lichen occurs in the Appalachians region of North America. It is also found in Britain and Ireland.
