= Thamnea thesioides =

Scientific classification
- Kingdom: Plantae
- Clade: Tracheophytes
- Clade: Angiosperms
- Clade: Eudicots
- Clade: Asterids
- Order: Bruniales
- Family: Bruniaceae
- Genus: Thamnea
- Species: T. thesioides

Binomial name
- Thamnea thesioides Dümmer

Species of flowering plant

Thamnea thesioides is a perennial, flowering shrub that is part of the Bruniaceae family. The species is endemic to the Western Cape and occurs in the Ceres District, Michell's Pass and the Mostertshoek Foreland.
