= Hypotrachyna vainioi =

Scientific classification
- Domain: Eukaryota
- Kingdom: Fungi
- Division: Ascomycota
- Class: Lecanoromycetes
- Order: Lecanorales
- Family: Parmeliaceae
- Genus: Hypotrachyna
- Species: H. vainioi

Binomial name
- Hypotrachyna vainioi Sipman, Elix & T.H.Nash (2009)

Species of lichen

Hypotrachyna vainioi is a species of foliose lichen in the family Parmeliaceae. It is found in Brazil.

== Taxonomy ==
The lichen was described as a new species in 2009 by Harrie Sipman, John Elix, and Thomas Nash in their 2009 monograph on the genus Hypotrachyna. The type was collected by Sipman in September 1997. The specific epithet honours Finnish lichenologist Edvard Vainio, "the first experienced lichenologist to do lichenological fieldwork in the tropics, in southeastern Brazil".

== Description ==
Hypotrachyna vainioi has a corticolous thallus measuring 5–8 cm (2.0–3.1 in) wide. The individual lobes comprising the thallus are flat to somewhat convex with entire margins, and measure 0.4–1.2 cm (0.16–0.47 in) wide. The upper surface of the thallus is pale grey with a smooth to shallowly wrinkled texture. The thallus completely lacks soredia, isidia, pustules, dactyls (finger-like protrusions), and lobules. The medulla is white, while the lower surface is black to dark brown near the margins. The apothecia are 2–10 mm wide with a dark brown disc. Ascospores of H. vainioi are ellipsoid and measure 10–12 by 5–8 μm.

=== Chemistry ===
Major secondary metabolites produced by the lichen are lichexanthone in the upper cortex, and echinocarpic acid in the medulla. Minor compounds include barbatic acid (minor), conechinocarpic acid (minor), subechinocarpic acid (minor), 4-O-demethylbarbatic acid (minor/trace), obtusatic acid (trace), and norobtusatic acid (trace).

== Habitat and distribution ==
It is only known from the type locality in Minas Gerais, Brazil. The type was collected in the Serra do Caraça, near the Caraça monastery, at an elevation of 1,300 m (4,300 ft). Hypotrachyna vainioi grows as an epiphyte in open scrubland.
