= Hypotrachyna indica =

Scientific classification
- Kingdom: Fungi
- Division: Ascomycota
- Class: Lecanoromycetes
- Order: Lecanorales
- Family: Parmeliaceae
- Genus: Hypotrachyna
- Species: H. indica

Binomial name
- Hypotrachyna indica Divakar, Lumbsch, Upreti & A.Crespo (2011)

Species of lichen

Hypotrachyna indica is a little-known species of foliose lichen in the family Parmeliaceae. Found in India, it was described as new to science in 2011. The lichen forms small, leaf-like growths up to 5 cm across with greenish-grey surfaces marked by conspicuous white spots and small pustules. It grows on the bark of conifer trees in the high-elevation montane forests of India's Nilgiri Hills at around 2,600 metres elevation.

== Taxonomy ==
Hypotrachyna indica was formally described in 2014 by Pradeep Divakar, H. Thorsten Lumbsch, Dalip Upreti and Ana Crespo; the holotype was collected on the trunk of a conifer in the Nilgiri Hills, Tamil Nadu. The specific epithet refers to the country where the type material was collected.

== Description ==
The thallus of Hypotrachyna indica is corticolous (growing on bark), tightly attached to its substrate, and up to about 5 cm across. Lobes are short, sub-linear and forked dichotomously, each 0.5–2 mm wide with truncate tips. The upper surface is greenish grey, dull and conspicuously white-spotted (maculate); near the lobe ends a faint network of ridges may appear. Numerous subterminal pustules erupt from the surface but do not develop into powdery soredia; instead they may shed tiny, cortex-covered granules from their margins. The upper cortex is fragile and often flakes away, leaving small blackened patches.

Internally the medulla is white, while the lower surface is black with a narrow brown margin. This underside is furnished with copious, richly branched rhizines that reach about 1.5 mm in length and anchor the lichen to the bark. Sexual (apothecia) and asexual (pycnidia) fruit bodies have not been observed in this species. Chemical spot tests give the following reactions: cortex K+ (yellow); medulla K−, C−, KC+ (orange), P−. Thin-layer chromatography detects atranorin together with a suite of barbatic-series acids—barbatic, 4-O-demethylbarbatic, obtusatic and trace norobtusatic acids.

Although the species resembles the pantropical H. exasplendens, it differs in both chemistry and morphology: H. indica contains barbatic, 4-O-demethylbarbatic, obtusatic and norobtusatic acids rather than alectoronic acid, and its upper surface bears pustules that break open without forming soredia. It can also be separated from H. exsecta by its much narrower lobes, flaking cortex and absence of soredia.

== Habitat and distribution ==
The species is known only from its type locality on the Dodabetta trail between Samer and Tiger Hills in the Nilgiri Hills, Western Ghats, southern India. It grows on the trunks of coniferous trees within open yet humid montane forest at about 2,600 m elevation.
