= Thamnea gracilis =

Scientific classification
- Kingdom: Plantae
- Clade: Tracheophytes
- Clade: Angiosperms
- Clade: Eudicots
- Clade: Asterids
- Order: Bruniales
- Family: Bruniaceae
- Genus: Thamnea
- Species: T. gracilis

Binomial name
- Thamnea gracilis Oliv.

Synonyms
- Schinzafra gracilis (Oliv.) Kuntze

Species of flowering plant

Thamnea gracilis is a perennial, flowering shrub that is part of the Bruniaceae family. The plant is endemic to the Western Cape and is part of the fynbos.
