= Hypotrachyna appalachensis =

Scientific classification
- Domain: Eukaryota
- Kingdom: Fungi
- Division: Ascomycota
- Class: Lecanoromycetes
- Order: Lecanorales
- Family: Parmeliaceae
- Genus: Hypotrachyna
- Species: H. appalachensis

Binomial name
- Hypotrachyna appalachensis Lendemer & J.L. Allen (2020)

Species of lichen

Hypotrachyna appalachensis is a species of blue-gray to gray foliose lichen in the family Parmeliaceae. It can be found growing in eastern North America in the southern Appalachian Mountains. The species grows on the bark or wood of trees, specifically hardwood trees, either on the tree's trunk or base. Its name was chosen due to its distribution being entirely restricted to the Appalachian Mountains. The species was originally thought to be Hypotrachyna minarum, which it is morphologically identical to, until molecular data showed H. appalachensis consistently produced higher concentrations of 4,5-di-O-methylhiascic acid. As a result, H. appalachensis can only be distinguished with certainty from H. minarum by using TLC, which can detect this molecular difference.
