= Hypotrachyna constictovexans =

Scientific classification
- Kingdom: Fungi
- Division: Ascomycota
- Class: Lecanoromycetes
- Order: Lecanorales
- Family: Parmeliaceae
- Genus: Hypotrachyna
- Species: H. constictovexans

Binomial name
- Hypotrachyna constictovexans (Sipman) Divakar, A.Crespo, Sipman, Elix & Lumbsch (2013)

Synonyms
- Everniastrum constictovexans Sipman (2011)

Species of lichen-forming fungus

Hypotrachyna constictovexans is a little-known species of foliose lichen in the family Parmeliaceae. Known only from a single specimen collected in 1976, it is found in the highlands of Peru. Its thallus can grow over 5 cm wide, featuring long, straight, and separate lobes that are highly convex and tube-like, with a pale grey, slightly shiny upper surface adorned with cylindrical isidia.

== Taxonomy ==
The lichen was described as new to science in 2011 by the Dutch lichenologist Harrie Sipman, who classified it in the genus Everniastrum. The type specimen was collected in 1976 along the Cusco-Pilcopata-Paucartambo Road in Cusco Province, Peru. The species epithet combines consticto, which refers to the presence of the substance constictic acid, and vexans, which alludes to the lichen's resemblance to Everniastrum vexans. The taxon was transferred to Hypotrachyna in 2013 by Pradeep Divakar and colleagues after molecular phylogenetics analysis showed that Everniastrum was nested within Hypotrachyna and better treated as a subgenus.

== Description ==
Hypotrachyna constictovexans has a foliose to somewhat fruticose thallus that is typically over 5 cm wide and is not coriaceous (leathery). Its lobes are long, straight, and separate, measuring 0.6–1.5 mm in width. These lobes are characteristically very convex, almost tube-like in shape over most of their length. The upper surface of the thallus is pale grey, slightly shiny, without a powdery coating (epruinose), and shows weak spotting. It is covered with cylindrical isidia, which are the same colour as the thallus but may have a brown cap when young and often develop an erect, black bristle-like structure (cilium) at the top when older. The thallus lacks soredia, pustules, finger-like projections (dactyls), or small lobes (lobules). The interior medulla of the thallus is white, whereas the lower surface is black, turning to brown towards the tips of the lobes. Black, slender cilia measuring 1–4 mm in length are present on the lower surface; these can be simple or occasionally once dichotomously branched. Apothecia (spore-producing structures) and pycnidia (conidia-producing structures) have not been observed to occur in this species.

In terms of spot test reactions, the upper cortex of Hypotrachyna constictovexans is K+ (yellow), while the medulla is K+ (orange) and Pd+ (orange-red). The lichen does not show any colour change with C or KC reagents and shows no fluorescence under UV light. The thallus contains atranorin in the upper cortex and constictic and protolichesterinic acids in the medulla, as confirmed by thin-layer chromatography.

== Distribution ==
At the time of its original publication, the lichen was known only from a single specimen collected at the type locality.
