= Hypotrachyna adaffinis =

Scientific classification
- Kingdom: Fungi
- Division: Ascomycota
- Class: Lecanoromycetes
- Order: Lecanorales
- Family: Parmeliaceae
- Genus: Hypotrachyna
- Species: H. adaffinis

Binomial name
- Hypotrachyna adaffinis Sipman (1992)

Species of lichen

Hypotrachyna is a species of foliose lichen in the family Parmeliaceae. Originally described from specimens collected in Venezuela, it is found in mountains throughout the Neotropics, where it grows on pine and hardwood bark.
