= Thamnea massoniana =

Scientific classification
- Kingdom: Plantae
- Clade: Tracheophytes
- Clade: Angiosperms
- Clade: Eudicots
- Clade: Asterids
- Order: Bruniales
- Family: Bruniaceae
- Genus: Thamnea
- Species: T. massoniana

Binomial name
- Thamnea massoniana Dümmer

Species of flowering plant

Thamnea massoniana is a perennial, flowering shrub that is part of the Bruniaceae family. The species is endemic to the Western Cape and occurs from Du Toit's Kloof to the Hottentots Holland Mountains. Six subpopulations are known, each consisting of approximately twenty plants. The plant is part of the fynbos. It is thought that the population may not exceed 1 000 plants. It currently has no threats.
