= Hypotrachyna brueggeri =

Scientific classification
- Domain: Eukaryota
- Kingdom: Fungi
- Division: Ascomycota
- Class: Lecanoromycetes
- Order: Lecanorales
- Family: Parmeliaceae
- Genus: Hypotrachyna
- Species: H. brueggeri

Binomial name
- Hypotrachyna brueggeri C.H.Ribeiro & Marcelli (2002)

Species of lichen

Hypotrachyna brueggeri is a species of foliose lichen in the family Parmeliaceae. Described as a new species in 2002, it is known only from the type locality in southeastern Brazil, where it was collected at elevations of 1,000–1,400 m (3,300–4,600 ft). This lichen forms sprawling rosettes 10–15 cm across with broad, overlapping lobes and is distinguished by distinctive branched pustules that give its surface a rough texture. It grows on both tree bark and granite rocks in the moist montane forests of the Mantiqueira and Serra do Mar mountain systems, where persistent fog provides the humid conditions it requires.

== Taxonomy ==
Hypotrachyna brueggeri was introduced to science in 2002 by C.H. Ribeiro and M.P. Marcelli during their systematic survey of parmelioid lichens in south-eastern Brazil. The type specimen was collected in montane Atlantic Forest at Parque Estadual do Ibitipoca (Minas Gerais) from the trunk of a candeia (Eremanthus erythropappus) in a well-lit patch of forest on 19 March 1994. The authors placed the species in the large foliose genus Hypotrachyna (family Parmeliaceae), which is typified by a black-rimmed lower surface and a suite of secondary metabolites. The species epithet commemorates the Brazilian botanist Márcio Caetano Brüegger, whose work helped protect and document the flora of Ibitipoca.

Chemically, H. brueggeri is defined by a cortical layer rich in atranorin and a medulla that contains protocetraric acid alongside several unidentified compounds. Spot tests produce a K+ (yellow) reaction in the cortex, while the medulla is P+ (yellow) but otherwise unresponsive; neither cortex nor medulla fluoresce under ultraviolet light. This chemical fingerprint, together with the presence of distinctive isidioid pustules (see below), separates the taxon from superficially similar species such as H. dactylifera and H. consimilis.

== Description ==
The thallus forms lax, rather sprawling rosettes 10–15 cm across. Its surface is dull white, ageing to pale grey, and is divided into broad, flattened lobes (laciniae) 2–4 mm wide. Lobes overlap like roof tiles and may arch slightly upwards; their tips are square-cut and edged by a fine black line, a common trait in Hypotrachyna. Unlike many in the genus, the thallus lacks maculae (pale blotches), soredia (powdery propagules) and true isidia (finger-like outgrowths). Instead, it carries crowded, branched pustulae—small blister-like swellings that originate from inflated isidia but do not break open to release powder. These "isidioid pustules" reach 0.5–1.5 mm in height and give the surface a distinctly rough texture.

Internally, the medulla is snow-white. The lower surface is black, wrinkled and traversed by low veins; around the margin it bears plentiful rhizines—forked, root-like fibres 0.5–1 mm long that anchor the lichen to its substrate. No sexual fruit-bodies (apothecia) or flask-shaped asexual structures (pycnidia) have yet been observed, suggesting that the species relies mainly on vegetative dispersal via fragments or the persistent pustules.

== Habitat and distribution ==
Hypotrachyna brueggeri is confirmed from two moist montane localities in south-eastern Brazil. The holotype was found at roughly 1,100–1,200 m in the Serra do Ibitipoca (Minas Gerais), where mist-laden Atlantic Forest intergrades with open candeia woodland. Here the lichen colonises the bark of living candeia trees in well-illuminated but humid forest edges. A second gathering comes from Campos do Jordão State Park in neighbouring São Paulo state (about 1,400 m elevation), where it was found on granite boulders beside the Sapucaí-Guaçu River, indicating that the species can occupy both lignicolous (wood-dwelling) and saxicolous (rock-dwelling) niches provided the microclimate remains cool and persistently moist.

Because collections are few despite intensive surveys in surrounding ranges, H. brueggeri may be genuinely localised to the fog-prone highlands of the Mantiqueira and Serra do Mar systems. Equally, its whitish thallus and lack of conspicuous reproductive structures mean it could be overlooked among larger foliose species.
