= Thamnea matroosbergensis =

Scientific classification
- Kingdom: Plantae
- Clade: Tracheophytes
- Clade: Angiosperms
- Clade: Eudicots
- Clade: Asterids
- Order: Bruniales
- Family: Bruniaceae
- Genus: Thamnea
- Species: T. matroosbergensis

Binomial name
- Thamnea matroosbergensis A.V.Hall

Species of flowering plant

Thamnea matroosbergensis is a perennial, flowering shrub that is part of the Bruniaceae family. The species is endemic to the Western Cape and occurs in the Matroosberg where it has a range of less than 1 km^{2}. The plant is part of the fynbos and is considered critically rare.
