= Hypotrachyna alectorialiorum =

Scientific classification
- Domain: Eukaryota
- Kingdom: Fungi
- Division: Ascomycota
- Class: Lecanoromycetes
- Order: Lecanorales
- Family: Parmeliaceae
- Genus: Hypotrachyna
- Species: H. alectorialiorum

Binomial name
- Hypotrachyna alectorialiorum Elix, T.H.Nash & Sipman (2009)

Species of lichen

Hypotrachyna alectorialiorum is a species of foliose lichen in the family Parmeliaceae. It is known only from the type locality in Minas Gerais, Brazil, where it was found growing on soil over rock, at an elevation of 1,200 m (3,900 ft). The specific epithet refers to the presence of the secondary chemicals alectorialic acid and hypoalectorialic acid.
