= Hypotrachyna anzeana =

Scientific classification
- Domain: Eukaryota
- Kingdom: Fungi
- Division: Ascomycota
- Class: Lecanoromycetes
- Order: Lecanorales
- Family: Parmeliaceae
- Genus: Hypotrachyna
- Species: H. anzeana

Binomial name
- Hypotrachyna anzeana Elix, T.H.Nash & Sipman (2009)

Species of lichen

Hypotrachyna anzeana is a species of foliose lichen in the family Parmeliaceae. It occurs in the Andes of Colombia and Bolivia, where it grows over moss cushions on acidic rocks at an elevation of 3,500–3,900 m (11,500–12,800 ft). The specific epithet honours the collector of the type specimen, the environmental biologist Rafael Anze Martin.
