= Hypotrachyna brevidactylata =

Scientific classification
- Domain: Eukaryota
- Kingdom: Fungi
- Division: Ascomycota
- Class: Lecanoromycetes
- Order: Lecanorales
- Family: Parmeliaceae
- Genus: Hypotrachyna
- Species: H. brevidactylata

Binomial name
- Hypotrachyna brevidactylata Sipman, Elix & T.H.Nash (2009)

Species of lichen

Hypotrachyna brevidactylata is a species of foliose lichen in the family Parmeliaceae. It is an uncommon species that occurs in the mountains of Costa Rica, and in the Andes of Bolivia and Ecuador, at elevations of 2,500–3,600 m (8,200–11,800 ft). Its specific epithet refers to its resemblance to Hypotrachyna brevispora, and the presence of laminal dactyls (hollow, nodular to cylindrical protuberances that resemble a swollen isidium, and bounded by a cortex).
