= Hypotrachyna oprah =

Scientific classification
- Domain: Eukaryota
- Kingdom: Fungi
- Division: Ascomycota
- Class: Lecanoromycetes
- Order: Lecanorales
- Family: Parmeliaceae
- Genus: Hypotrachyna
- Species: H. oprah

Binomial name
- Hypotrachyna oprah Lendemer & J.L.Allen (2019)

Species of fungus

Hypotrachyna oprah is a species of foliose lichen in the family Parmeliaceae. Found in the United States in North Carolina, Alabama, and Florida, it was described as new to science in 2019 by lichenologists James Lendemer and Jessica Allen. It was named in honor of Oprah Winfrey. It contains the secondary chemical lichexanthone.
