= Hypotrachyna kauffmaniana =

Scientific classification
- Kingdom: Fungi
- Division: Ascomycota
- Class: Lecanoromycetes
- Order: Lecanorales
- Family: Parmeliaceae
- Genus: Hypotrachyna
- Species: H. kauffmaniana

Binomial name
- Hypotrachyna kauffmaniana Lendemer & J.L. Allen (2020)

Species of lichen

Hypotrachyna kauffmaniana is a species of blue-gray to gray foliose lichen in the family Parmeliaceae. This species can only be located in eastern North America along the Appalachian Mountains, commonly found in Georgia, South Carolina, North Carolina, and Tennessee. The habitat of H. kauffmaniana is typically mid-elevation forests on both hardwood and conifer tree branches/trunks within the southern Appalachians. On rare occasions, this species can be found growing on non-calcareous rocks. H. kauffmaniana gathered its name in honor of Gary Kauffman, a botanist for the National Forest Service. H. kauffmaniana can be commonly confused alongside Hypotrachyna showmanii, but is distinguishable due to the former producing different levels of gyrophoric acid (specifically 3-methoxy-2,4-di-O-methylgyrophoric acid and 2,4-di-O-methylgyrophoric acid) as well as possessing slightly different morphological properties.
