= Lima Duarte, Minas Gerais =

Lima Duarte
- Municipality
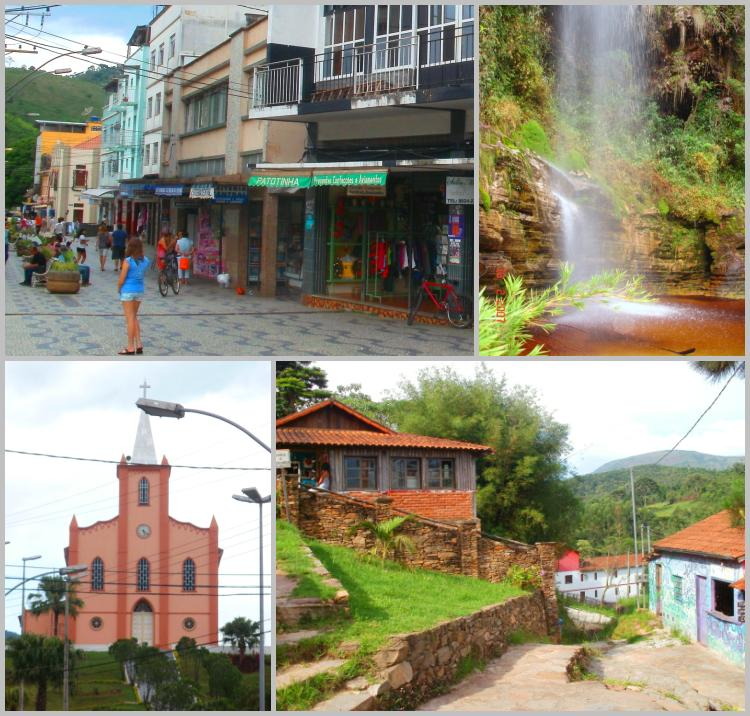
- Clockwise from top left: Praça Paiva Duque, a waterfall in Ibitipoca state park, Conceição do Ibitipoca, church of Nossa Senhora das Dores

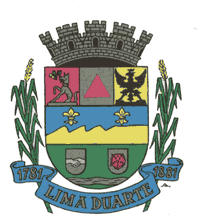
- Coat of arms

- Coordinates: 21°50′53″S 43°48′27″W
- Country: Brazil
- Region: Southeast
- State: Minas Gerais
- Established: 3 Oct 1881

Area
  - Total: 848,089 km^{2} (327,449 sq mi)
- Elevation: 860 m (2,820 ft)

Population (2020)
  - Total: 16,724
- Time zone: UTC−3 (BRT)
- Website: Lima Duarte, Minas Gerais

Lima Duarte is a municipality in the state of Minas Gerais, Brazil. It has a population of 16,724 inhabitants (2020) and a total area of 848 square kilometres (327 mi^{2}) and lies at an elevation of 860 metres (2,822 ft) in the foothills of the Mantiqueira Mountains. It was given city status in 1881.

It is 330 kilometres (210 mi) from the state capital, Belo Horizonte, and is part of the Zona da Mata, a region whose economic and cultural center is Juiz de Fora. It is connected with this city by highway BR-267.

Ibitipoca state park is situated within the municipality about 25 kilometres (16 mi) from the city center.

Average maximum temperature: 28 °C (82 °F); Average minimum temperature: 10 °C (50 °F)

Most of the municipality is drained by the Paraíba do Sul River. The most important river is the Rio do Peixe, a tributary of the Paraibuna.

The name of the city has no connection to the famous Brazilian actor Lima Duarte, but was in homage to Conselheiro José Rodrigues de Lima Duarte, political leader from Barbacena, who in the nineteenth century was Minister of the Navy and a Senator of the Empire.

The city's economy is mainly based on tourism and the dairy industry.

== See also ==
- List of municipalities in Minas Gerais
