= Hypotrachyna ahtiana =

Scientific classification
- Domain: Eukaryota
- Kingdom: Fungi
- Division: Ascomycota
- Class: Lecanoromycetes
- Order: Lecanorales
- Family: Parmeliaceae
- Genus: Hypotrachyna
- Species: H. ahtiana

Binomial name
- Hypotrachyna ahtiana Elix, T.H.Nash & Sipman (2009)

Species of lichen

Hypotrachyna ahtiana is a species of foliose lichen in the family Parmeliaceae. It is known only from the type locality in Venezuela, where it was collected in the Guyana Shield at an elevation of 1,950 m (6,400 ft). It is named to honour Finnish lichenologist Teuvo Ahti.
