= Hypotrachyna guatemalensis =

Scientific classification
- Kingdom: Fungi
- Division: Ascomycota
- Class: Lecanoromycetes
- Order: Lecanorales
- Family: Parmeliaceae
- Genus: Hypotrachyna
- Species: H. guatemalensis

Binomial name
- Hypotrachyna guatemalensis Elix & van den Boom (2011)
- Holotype: Santa María volcano, Guatemala

Species of lichen

Hypotrachyna guatemalensis is a rare species of foliose lichen in the family Parmeliaceae. Found in Guatemala, it was described as new to science in 2011. It grows on tree trunks at about 2,700 metres elevation on Guatemala's Santa María volcano. The species is distinguished by its small size, white interior, and the presence of the rare chemical compound conhypoprotocetraric acid.

== Taxonomy ==
Hypotrachyna guatemalensis was described in 2011 by John Elix and Pieter van den Boom from a single collection made on the northern slope of the Santa María volcano, western Guatemala. The epithet reflects its country of origin. Morphologically the species resembles the Brazilian H. bahiana, but it is markedly smaller (thalli 4–5 cm across versus 6–20 cm) and has a white medulla rather than one variably stained orange- to brown-pigmented. It also differs in its profusion of densely, many-times-branched rhizines and in its chemistry: H. guatemalensis contains the rare depsidone compound conhypoprotocetraric acid as its principal medullary compound, together with hypoprotocetraric and 4-O-demethylnotatic acids, whereas H. bahiana is dominated by protocetraric and virensic acids. The discovery adds a second known species in the genus to feature conhypoprotocetraric acid as a major secondary metabolite.

== Description ==
The lichen forms a tough, leaf-like (foliose) rosette 4–5 cm wide that lies flat or only loosely attached to its bark substrate. Its lobes are narrow and nearly linear, 1–4 mm across, with blunt, slightly rounded tips; their edges may be smooth or faintly scalloped. From above the surface appears grey-white to yellowish-grey. The lobe tips are sharply outlined by a black rim and retain a slight sheen, whereas the central parts are dull and finely wrinkled. No soredia or isidia vegetative propagules are produced by H. guatemalensis, and the upper cortex remains intact.

The lower surface is black, fading to brown towards the tips, and is densely clothed in richly dichotomously branched rhizines that often project beyond the margins. Apothecia (fruiting bodies) are frequent: small, stalkless to short-stalked cups 1–4 mm wide with pale-brown, shiny discs and thick, persistent rims. The ellipsoid ascospores are 7–9 × 5–6 μm. Immersed black pycnidia are common; they release colourless, slightly spindle-shaped conidia 6–8 × 1 μm.

Spot tests show KC+ (yellow) in the cortex (due to minor atranorin and chloroatranorin) and K+ (yellow→red) / P+ (orange-red) in the medulla, indicating salazinic-series depsidones. Thin-layer chromatography detects conhypoprotocetraric acid as the main component in the medulla, with hypoprotocetraric acid minor and 4-O-demethylnotatic acid only in trace amounts.

== Habitat and distribution ==
Hypotrachyna guatemalensis is known only from its type locality at about 2,700 m elevation on the Santa María volcano, Quetzaltenango Department, Guatemala. There it grew on the trunk of Alnus arguta beside a footpath through a mosaic of small fields, shrubs, remnant trees and rock outcrops.
