= Thamnea =

Scientific classification
- Kingdom: Plantae
- Clade: Tracheophytes
- Clade: Angiosperms
- Clade: Eudicots
- Clade: Asterids
- Order: Bruniales
- Family: Bruniaceae
- Genus: Thamnea; Sol. ex Brongn.

Genus of flowering plants

Thamnea is a genus of flowering plants belonging to the family Bruniaceae.

Its native range is South African Republic.

Species:

- Thamnea depressa Oliv.
- Thamnea gracilis Oliv.
- Thamnea hirtella Oliv.
- Thamnea massoniana Dümmer
- Thamnea matroosbergensis A.V.Hall
- Thamnea teres (Oliv.) Class.-Bockh. & E.G.H.Oliv.
- Thamnea thesioides Dümmer
- Thamnea uniflora (L.) Sol. ex Brongn.
- Thamnea ustulata (Thunb.) A.V.Hall
