= Thamnea hirtella =

Scientific classification
- Kingdom: Plantae
- Clade: Tracheophytes
- Clade: Angiosperms
- Clade: Eudicots
- Clade: Asterids
- Order: Bruniales
- Family: Bruniaceae
- Genus: Thamnea
- Species: T. hirtella

Binomial name
- Thamnea hirtella Oliv.

Synonyms
- Schinzafra hirtella (Oliv.) Kuntze

Species of flowering plant

Thamnea hirtella is a perennial, flowering shrub that is part of the Bruniaceae family. The species is endemic to the Western Cape and occurs in the Witzenberg Mountains. It has a range of 280 km² and there are four subpopulations. The plant is part of the fynbos.
