= Thamnea depressa =

Scientific classification
- Kingdom: Plantae
- Clade: Tracheophytes
- Clade: Angiosperms
- Clade: Eudicots
- Clade: Asterids
- Order: Bruniales
- Family: Bruniaceae
- Genus: Thamnea
- Species: T. depressa

Binomial name
- Thamnea depressa Oliv.

Synonyms
- Schinzafra gracilis (Oliv.) Kuntze

Species of flowering plant

Thamnea depressa is a perennial, flowering shrub that is part of the Bruniaceae family. The plant is endemic to the Western Cape and was part of the fynbos. It occurred at Genadendal. It is considered extinct; where the plant was found in 1815 by William John Burchell, it has now been converted into plantations and is also infested with invasive plants.
