= Copper usnate =

Chemical compound

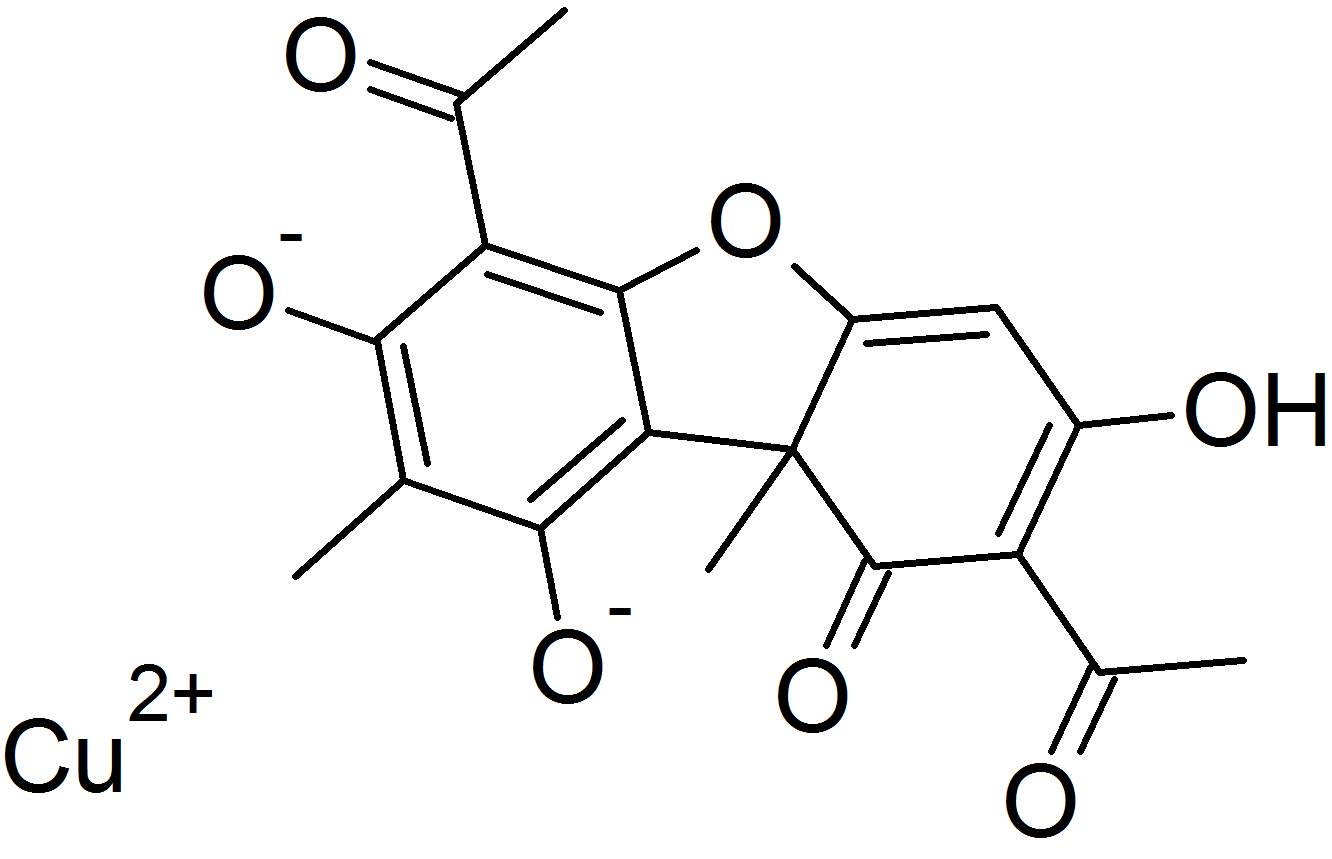

Clinical data
- ATC code: G01AX15 (WHO)

Identifiers
- IUPAC name: Copper 4,8-diacetyl-2,9a-dimethyl-7,9-dioxodibenzofuran-1,3-diolate
- PubChem CID: 46222573
- DrugBank: DB13830
- ChemSpider: 30647422
- UNII: 2EV5P25E2S
- CompTox Dashboard (EPA): DTXSID101028151

Chemical and physical data
- Formula: C_{18}H_{14}CuO_{7}
- Molar mass: 405.849 g·mol^{−1}
- 3D model (JSmol): Interactive image
- SMILES: Cc1c(c(c2c(c1[O-])C3(C(=CC(=O)C(C3=O)C(=O)C)O2)C)C(=O)C)[O-].[Cu+2]
- InChI: InChI=1S/C18H16O7.Cu/c1-6-14(22)12(8(3)20)16-13(15(6)23)18(4)10(25-16)5-9(21)11(7(2)19)17(18)24;/h5,11,22-23H,1-4H3;/q;+2/p-2; Key:BJKWDVRCNOATJS-UHFFFAOYSA-L

Copper usnate is the copper salt of usnic acid. It has been used as an antimicrobial.
