= Hypotrachyna parasinuosa =

Scientific classification
- Kingdom: Fungi
- Division: Ascomycota
- Class: Lecanoromycetes
- Order: Lecanorales
- Family: Parmeliaceae
- Genus: Hypotrachyna
- Species: H. parasinuosa

Binomial name
- Hypotrachyna parasinuosa Sipman & Palice (2011)
- Holotype: Llanganates National Park, Ecuador

Species of lichen

Hypotrachyna parasinuosa is a rare species of corticolous (bark-dwelling) foliose lichen in the family Parmeliaceae. Found in Ecuador, it was described as new to science in 2011. It grows on tree branches in high-altitude cloud forests at around 3,800 metres elevation in Ecuador's Llanganates National Park. The species is recognized by its complete lack of attachment hairs (rhizines) on the underside and distinctive black, branching hairs (cilia) along the edges of its leaf-like lobes.

== Taxonomy ==
Hypotrachyna parasinuosa was described in 2011 by Harrie Sipman and Zdeněk Palice from a single specimen collected in the páramo-fringe forests of the Cordillera Llanganates, central Ecuador. Its epithet signals the close resemblance to Hypotrachyna sinuosa, a widespread Andean species with similar lobes and chemistry. The new taxon, however, is readily distinguished by two morphological characters: (1) the complete absence of rhizines on the lower surface and (2) black marginal cilia that fork once to thrice at wide angles. Chemically it shares the salazinic acid medullary profile typical of the H. sinuosa complex, but the unique ciliation pattern supports its recognition as a separate species.

== Description ==
The thallus of H. parasinuosa forms loose rosettes about 5 cm across on bark. Lobes are narrow and almost straight, 2–3 mm wide, and end in blunt, slightly up-turned tips. The upper surface is greenish-yellow with a narrow black rim, faintly glossy and free of any powdery or warty vegetative propagules. Soralia (powdery reproductive cushions) develop at or near the lobe tips; they are initially cap-shaped but may spread across the surface, their pale-yellow soredia (roughly 60 μm) darkening with age.

Below, the cortex grades into a white medulla, while the lower surface is black, becoming pale brown near the lobe tips. Attachment hairs (rhizines) are entirely absent. Along the margins rise black, somewhat tree-like cilia 1–2 mm long and up to 0.2 mm thick at the base, each branching once or twice. No apothecia or pycnidia were seen. Spot tests show K– and KC+ (yellow) reactions in the cortex (due to minor usnic acid) and a medulla that is K+ (yellow → red) and P+ (orange-red), indicating the presence of salazinic acid with traces of consalazinic, norstictic and protocetraric acids.

== Habitat and distribution ==
Hypotrachyna parasinuosa is known only from its type locality, a well-lit, east-facing slope at 3,750– 3,800 m in Llanganates National Park, Tungurahua Province, Ecuador. There it groes on branches within a humid, stunted ('dwarfy') cloud forest community bordering open páramo.
