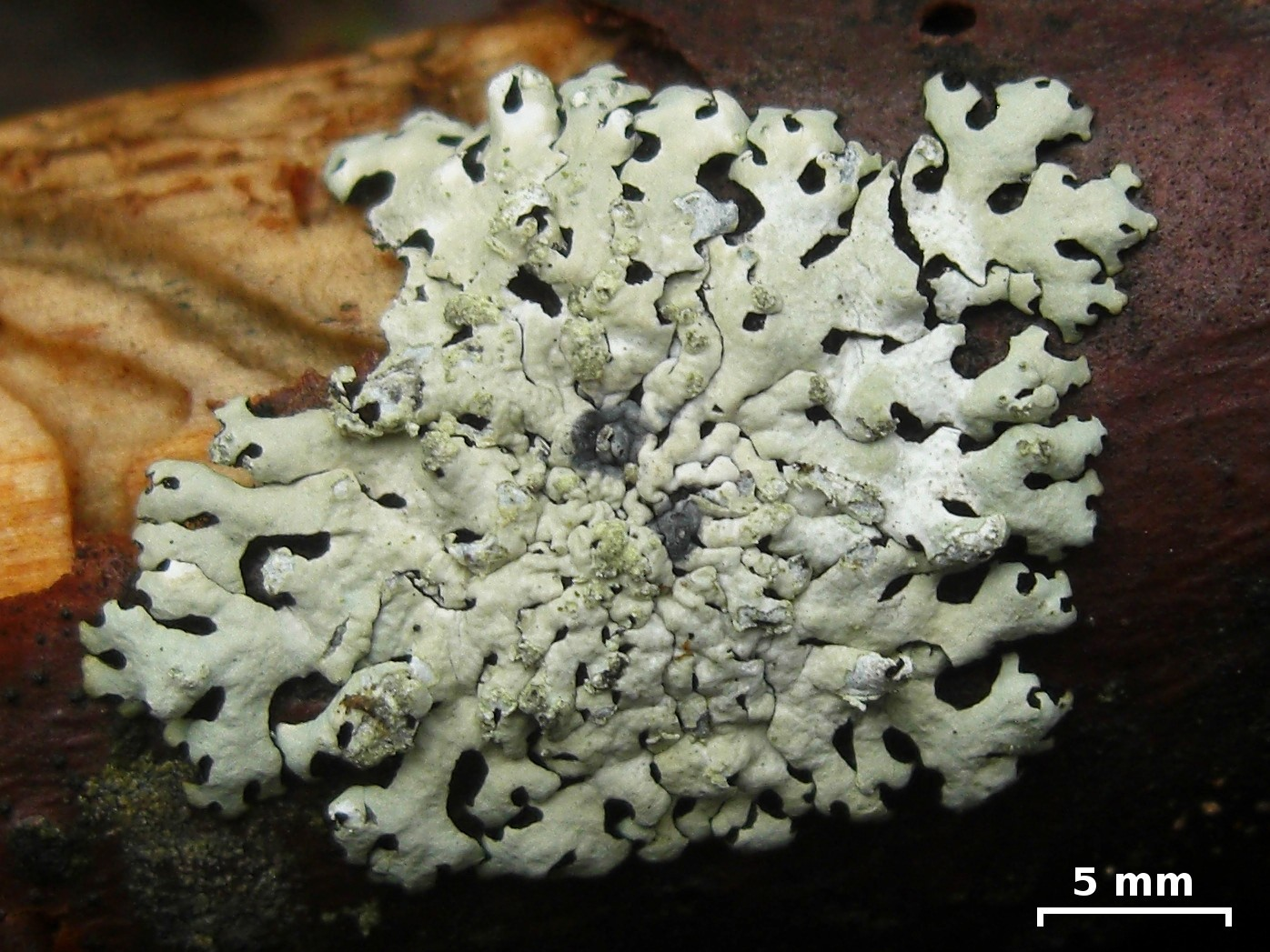
- Hypotrachyna osseoalba

Scientific classification
- Kingdom: Fungi
- Division: Ascomycota
- Class: Lecanoromycetes
- Order: Lecanorales
- Family: Parmeliaceae
- Genus: Hypotrachyna (Vain.) Hale (1974)

Type species
- Hypotrachyna brasiliana (Nyl.) Hale (1974)

Synonyms
- Cetrariastrum Sipman (1980); Everniastrum Hale (1976); Parmelia sect. Everniiformes Hue (1899); Parmelia sect. Hypotrachyna Vain. (1890); Parmelia subgen. Everniiformes Hue ex Hale & M.Wirth (1971); Parmelinopsis Elix & Hale (1987)

= Hypotrachyna =

Genus of fungi

Hypotrachyna is a genus of lichenized fungi within the family Parmeliaceae. According to the Dictionary of the Fungi (10th edition, 2008), the widespread genus contains about 198 species. Hypotrachyna was circumscribed by American lichenologist Mason Ellsworth Hale Jr in 1974.

== Species ==
- Hypotrachyna adaffinis
- Hypotrachyna addita
- Hypotrachyna adducta
- Hypotrachyna adjuncta
- Hypotrachyna aguirrei
- Hypotrachyna ahtiana
- Hypotrachyna alectorialiorum
- Hypotrachyna andensis
- Hypotrachyna angustissima
- Hypotrachyna anzeana
- Hypotrachyna appalachensis
- Hypotrachyna aspera
- Hypotrachyna bahiana
- Hypotrachyna bogotensis
- Hypotrachyna booralensis
- Hypotrachyna boquetensis
- Hypotrachyna bostrychodes
- Hypotrachyna brasiliana
- Hypotrachyna brevidactylata
- Hypotrachyna brevirhiza
- Hypotrachyna brueggeri
- Hypotrachyna britannica
- Hypotrachyna caraccensis
- Hypotrachyna cendensis
- Hypotrachyna chicitae
- Hypotrachyna chlorina
- Hypotrachyna citrella
- Hypotrachyna colensoica
- Hypotrachyna consimilis
- Hypotrachyna constictovexans
- Hypotrachyna convexa
- Hypotrachyna costaricensis
- Hypotrachyna croceopustulata
- Hypotrachyna culbersoniorum
- Hypotrachyna dactylifera
- Hypotrachyna dahlii
- Hypotrachyna densirhizinata
- Hypotrachyna dentella
- Hypotrachyna ducalis
- Hypotrachyna enderythraea
- Hypotrachyna endochlora
- Hypotrachyna ensifolia
- Hypotrachyna erythrodes
- Hypotrachyna evansii
- Hypotrachyna everniastroides
- Hypotrachyna exsecta
- Hypotrachyna exsplendens
- Hypotrachyna fissicarpa
- Hypotrachyna flavida
- Hypotrachyna flavospinulosa
- Hypotrachyna galbinica
- Hypotrachyna gondylophora
- Hypotrachyna guatemalensis
- Hypotrachyna habenula
- Hypotrachyna hafellneri
- Hypotrachyna halei
- Hypotrachyna heterochroa
- Hypotrachyna ikomae
- Hypotrachyna imbricatula
- Hypotrachyna immaculata
- Hypotrachyna indica
- Hypotrachyna infirma
- Hypotrachyna isidiocera
- Hypotrachyna isolopezii
- Hypotrachyna kauffmaniana
- Hypotrachyna koyaensis
- Hypotrachyna laevigata
- Hypotrachyna leeukopensis
- Hypotrachyna leiophylla
- Hypotrachyna leswellensis
- Hypotrachyna ligulata
- Hypotrachyna lineariloba
- Hypotrachyna livida
- Hypotrachyna lividescens
- Hypotrachyna longiloba
- Hypotrachyna lopezii
- Hypotrachyna lueckingii
- Hypotrachyna lythogoeana
- Hypotrachyna majoris
- Hypotrachyna massartii
- Hypotrachyna mcmulliniana
- Hypotrachyna minarum
- Hypotrachyna meridiensis
- Hypotrachyna meyeri
- Hypotrachyna microblasta
- Hypotrachyna microblastella
- Hypotrachyna monilifera
- Hypotrachyna neocrenata
- Hypotrachyna neodissecta
- Hypotrachyna neoflavida
- Hypotrachyna neoscytodes
- Hypotrachyna neosingularis
- Hypotrachyna nodakensis
- Hypotrachyna norlopezii
- Hypotrachyna novella
- Hypotrachyna obscurella
- Hypotrachyna oprah
- Hypotrachyna orientalis
- Hypotrachyna osseoalba
- Hypotrachyna osteoleuca
- Hypotrachyna palmarum
- Hypotrachyna paracitrella
- Hypotrachyna paramensis
- Hypotrachyna paraphyscioides
- Hypotrachyna parasinuosa
- Hypotrachyna partita
- Hypotrachyna physcioides
- Hypotrachyna pluriformis
- Hypotrachyna polydactyla
- Hypotrachyna producta
- Hypotrachyna prolongata
- Hypotrachyna proserpinensis
- Hypotrachyna protenta
- Hypotrachyna protoboliviana
- Hypotrachyna protoformosana
- Hypotrachyna pseudosinuosa
- Hypotrachyna pulvinata
- Hypotrachyna punoensis
- Hypotrachyna pustulifera
- Hypotrachyna radiculata
- Hypotrachyna reducens
- Hypotrachyna revoluta
- Hypotrachyna rhabdiformis
- Hypotrachyna riparia
- Hypotrachyna rockii
- Hypotrachyna rwandensis
- Hypotrachyna sanjosensis
- Hypotrachyna scytophylla
- Hypotrachyna silvatica
- Hypotrachyna sinuosa
- Hypotrachyna sinuosella
- Hypotrachyna spinulosa
- Hypotrachyna steyermarkii
- Hypotrachyna subaffinis
- Hypotrachyna subformosana
- Hypotrachyna sublaevigata
- Hypotrachyna subpustulifera
- Hypotrachyna subsaxatilis
- Hypotrachyna tariensis
- Hypotrachyna taylorensis
- Hypotrachyna thysanota
- Hypotrachyna tibellii
- Hypotrachyna vainioi
- Hypotrachyna velloziae
- Hypotrachyna virginica
