= Hypotrachyna paraphyscioides =

Conservation status
- Least Concern (IUCN 3.1)

Scientific classification
- Kingdom: Fungi
- Division: Ascomycota
- Class: Lecanoromycetes
- Order: Lecanorales
- Family: Parmeliaceae
- Genus: Hypotrachyna
- Species: H. paraphyscioides

Binomial name
- Hypotrachyna paraphyscioides Sipman (2011)

Species of lichen

Hypotrachyna paraphyscioides is a species of foliose lichen in the family Parmeliaceae. Described in 2011 from a single specimen collected in Colombia's Sierra Nevada de Santa Marta at nearly 2,900 metres elevation, this lichen is distinguished by its unusual forked marginal hairs and complete lack of attachment structures on its underside. It forms loose, rosette-shaped colonies on tree bark and is known only from its original discovery site in montane forest.

== Taxonomy ==
Hypotrachyna paraphyscioides was described in 2009 by Harrie Sipman from a single collection made on the northern slope of the Sierra Nevada de Santa Marta, Colombia, at 2,880 m elevation. Its epithet reflects the close external resemblance to H. physcioides: both share narrow, grey lobes and the same medullary chemistry. Molecular data were not available, but morphologically the new species is set apart by two striking features—forked marginal cilia and the complete absence of rhizines on the lower surface. These characters, together with a suite of barbatic acid derivatives in the medulla, distinguish H. paraphyscioides from all other described members of the genus.

== Description ==
This foliose lichen forms loose rosettes 5–10 cm across on bark. Lobes are sublinear, mostly separate, 1.5–3 mm wide, and end in blunt, slightly up-turned tips. The upper surface is pale grey with blackened rims, faintly glossy, and shows scattered pale blotches (maculae) but no powdery soredia, isidia, pustules or other vegetative propagules; the cortex remains intact throughout.

Along the margin—and occasionally under the lobe—rise black cilia 1–3 mm long that fork once or twice at wide angles, giving a comb-like outline. The lower surface is black, shading to pale brown near the tips, and entirely lacks attachment hairs (rhizines). Apothecia (fruiting bodies) are common, 2–7 mm in diameter, with shiny brown discs and crenulate, inward-curving rims; spores are ellipsoid, 10–13 × 6–7 μm. Immersed pycnidia are frequent and release narrowly fork-tipped conidia about 6 × 0.5 μm.

Chemical spot tests show atranorin in the cortex (K+ yellow) and a medulla rich in barbatic acid (C+ yellow-orange, KC+ orange); traces of obtusatic, 4-O-demethylbarbatic and norobtusatic acids are also present.

== Habitat and distribution ==
Hypotrachyna paraphyscioides is known solely from its type locality on the Sierra Nevada de Santa Marta, where it grew on the branch of a montane forest tree at almost 2,900 m.
