= Waaihoek =

Coordinates: 33.4721°S 19.3157°E

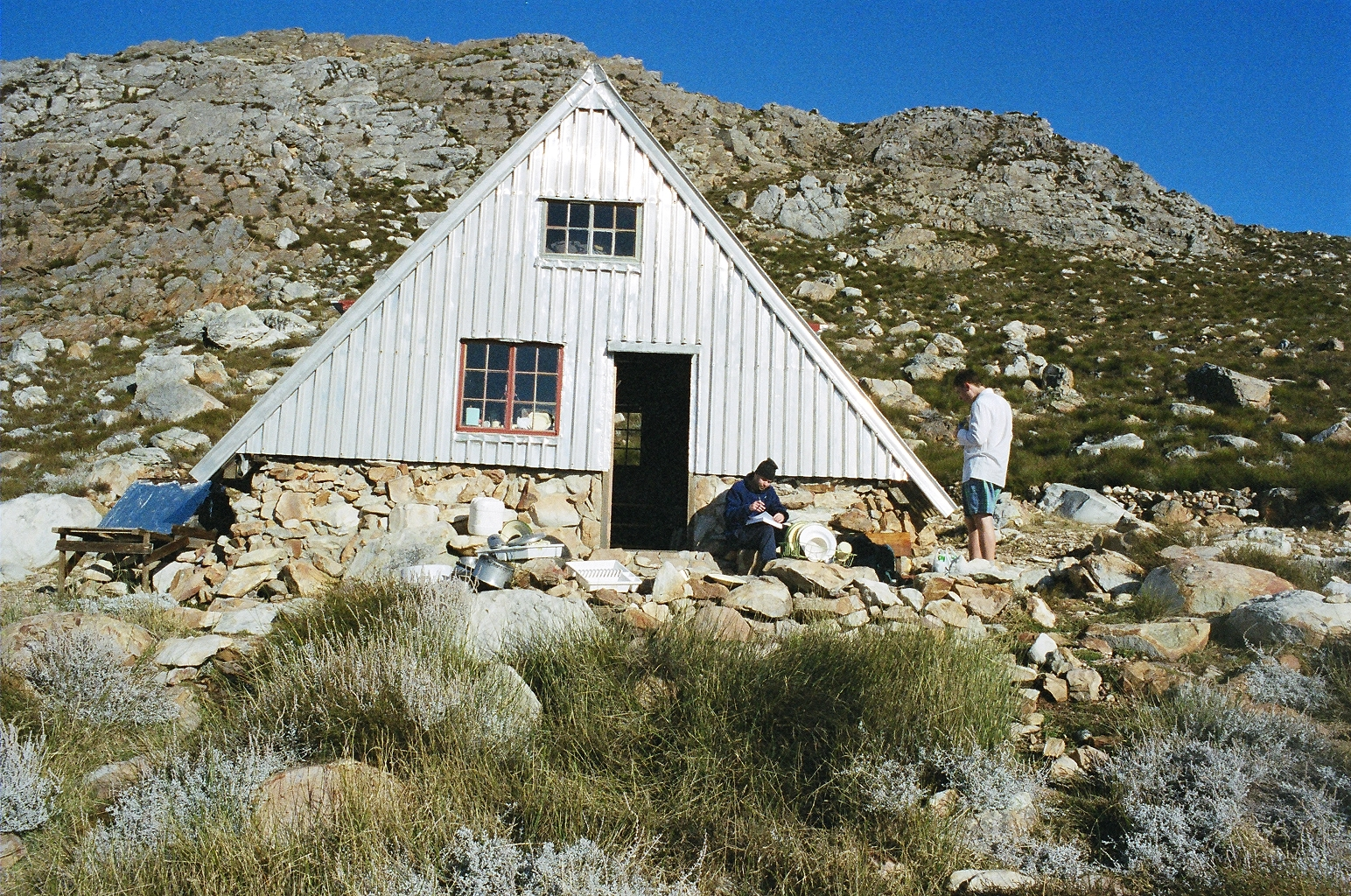
Hoare Hut

Waaihoek is the name of a peak at one of the vertices of a very large (8000ha), remote, rugged and mountainous rural property called Zuurberg ("Sour Mountain"), located about 60 km north-east of Cape Town, on the margin of a great sandstone massif known as the Hex River Mountains. Waaihoek is well known in the Western Cape as the 'home' of the University of Cape Town Mountain and Ski Club (UCTMSC). The name in Afrikaans means 'blow corner', or perhaps 'howl corner', as in 'the corner where the wind blows or howls'. The first part of the name, "waai", is a verb, not a noun. The name is pronounced 'Vye hook', where vye rhymes with eye.

Snow often falls in winter and lies on the ground for a few weeks between July and September, when members of the UCTMSC have in past years operated a private ski tow in the vicinity of Waaihoek Peak. The club maintains two huts in the area. Both were built by students, who carried most of the materials up the mountain on their backs. The older and smaller structure, built before the Second World War, is called Pells Hut. There is a newer and much larger hut somewhat higher up the slopes. This structure, Hoare Hut, was built in 1971.
