= Ibitipoca State Park =

State park in Minas Gerais, Brazil

- Parque Estadual do Ibitipoca
- IUCN category II (national park)
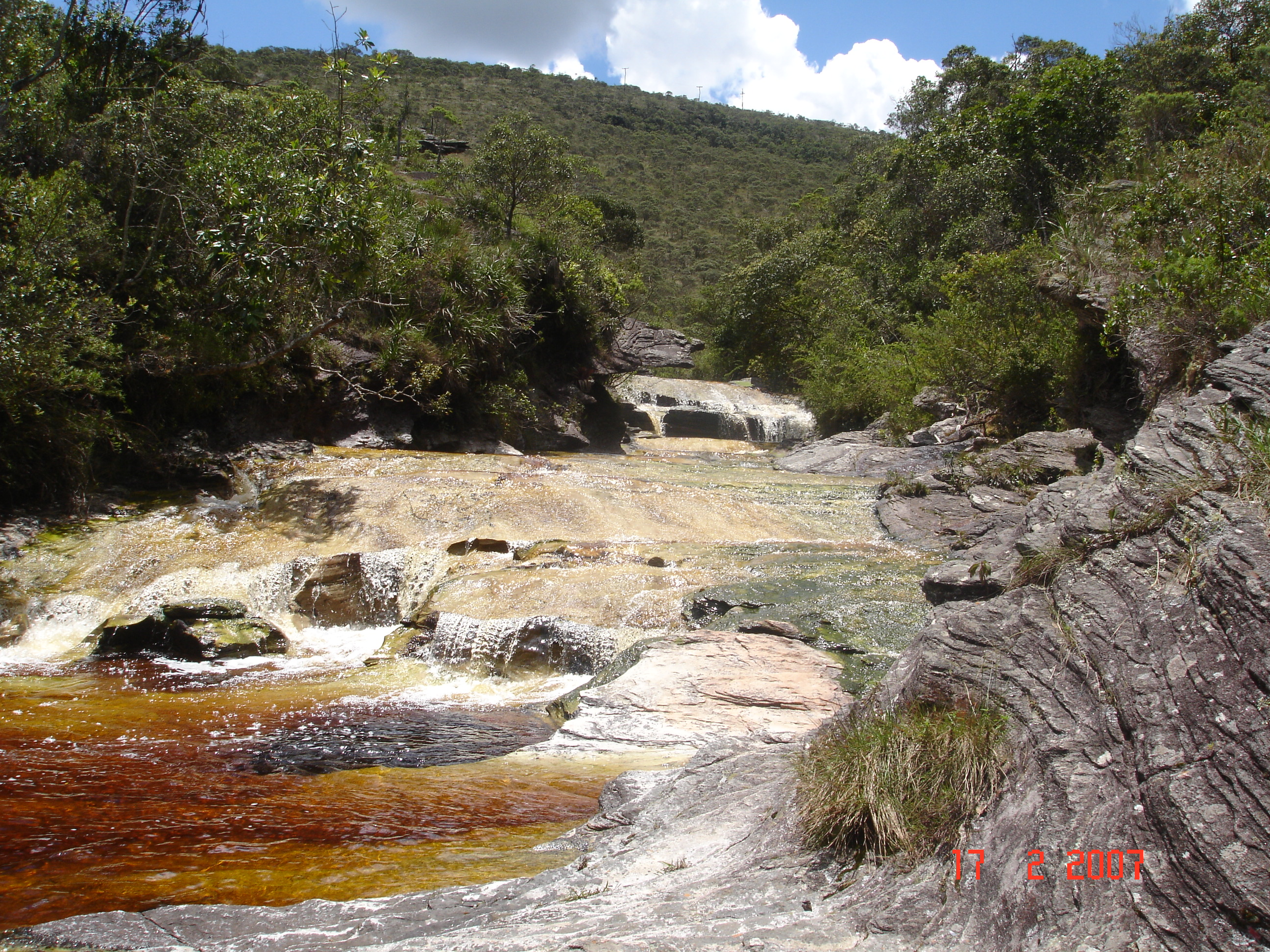
- One of the waterfalls in the park

- Location within Brazil
- Nearest city: Juiz de Fora, Minas Gerais
- Coordinates: 21.709°S 43.884°W
- Area: 1,488 hectares (3,680 acres)
- Designation: State park
- Created: 4 July 1973

The Ibitipoca State Park (Portuguese: Parque Estadual do Ibitipoca) is a forested state park is the state of Minas Gerais, Brazil.

== Location ==
Ibitipoca State Park has area of 1,488 hectares (3,680 acres) and is situated 3 kilometres (1.9 mi) from the district of Conceição do Ibitipoca (which is sustained by tourism attracted by the park). It was created on 4 July 1973 and is administered by the Instituto Estadual de Florestas of Minas Gerais. It is in the municipality of Lima Duarte.

Entry to the park is charged and is limited to 300 visitors per day during the week and 800 at weekends and on holidays. Camping is permitted in the park but this is also limited to a certain number of visitors and only in the designated site. The camp site has a restaurant, café and lavatories.

== Toponym ==
"Ibitipoca" derives from the Tupi and signifies "burst mountain, from the terms ybytyra ("mountain") e pok ("burst").

== Climate and vegetation ==
The climate is humid subtropical, with mild rainy summers and dry winters. The park is on an outcrop of quartzite with a shallow soil (Cambisol) layer made up principally of organic material and sand formed by the erosion of the rock. Because of this a large part of the vegetation is Xerophyte, comprising true grasses and low growing herbaceous plants. In the regions where the soil is shallow are bushes, cactuses and bromeliads characteristic of rocky places. The rivers of the park are caramel coloured because of high levels of organic material.

== Attractions ==
The main attractions are the caves, mountains and waterfalls. The highest point in the park is known as Pico da Lombada and is a little more than 1,800 metres (5,900 ft) above sea level.

Some tourist spots are the Janela do Céu, Cachoeirinha, Pico do Pião, Cruzeiro, Lago dos Espelhos, Cachoeira dos Macacos and Cachoeira da Pedra Quadrada.

A trip to the park is characterized by long walks—the return walk to the Janela do Céu, for example, is about 13 kilometres (8.1 mi) and The Cachoeirinha is 7 kilometres (4.3 mi) from the camp site. Pico da Lombada has an interesting characteristic: The view from there to the horizon is 360°—one can see to the horizon in whichever direction as no mountain stands in the way.

== Access ==
Access is by a road of about 27 kilometres (17 mi) off of the main BR-267 road in Lima Duarte to the village of Conceição de Ibitipoca. Part of the track is by dirt road but its steepest stretch between the Fazenda do Engenho and the village is paved as it is in other places. from the village to the park is a further 3 kilometres (1.9 mi) on paved road. In the rainy season this access can be difficult due to poor maintenance of the road.

== Gallery ==
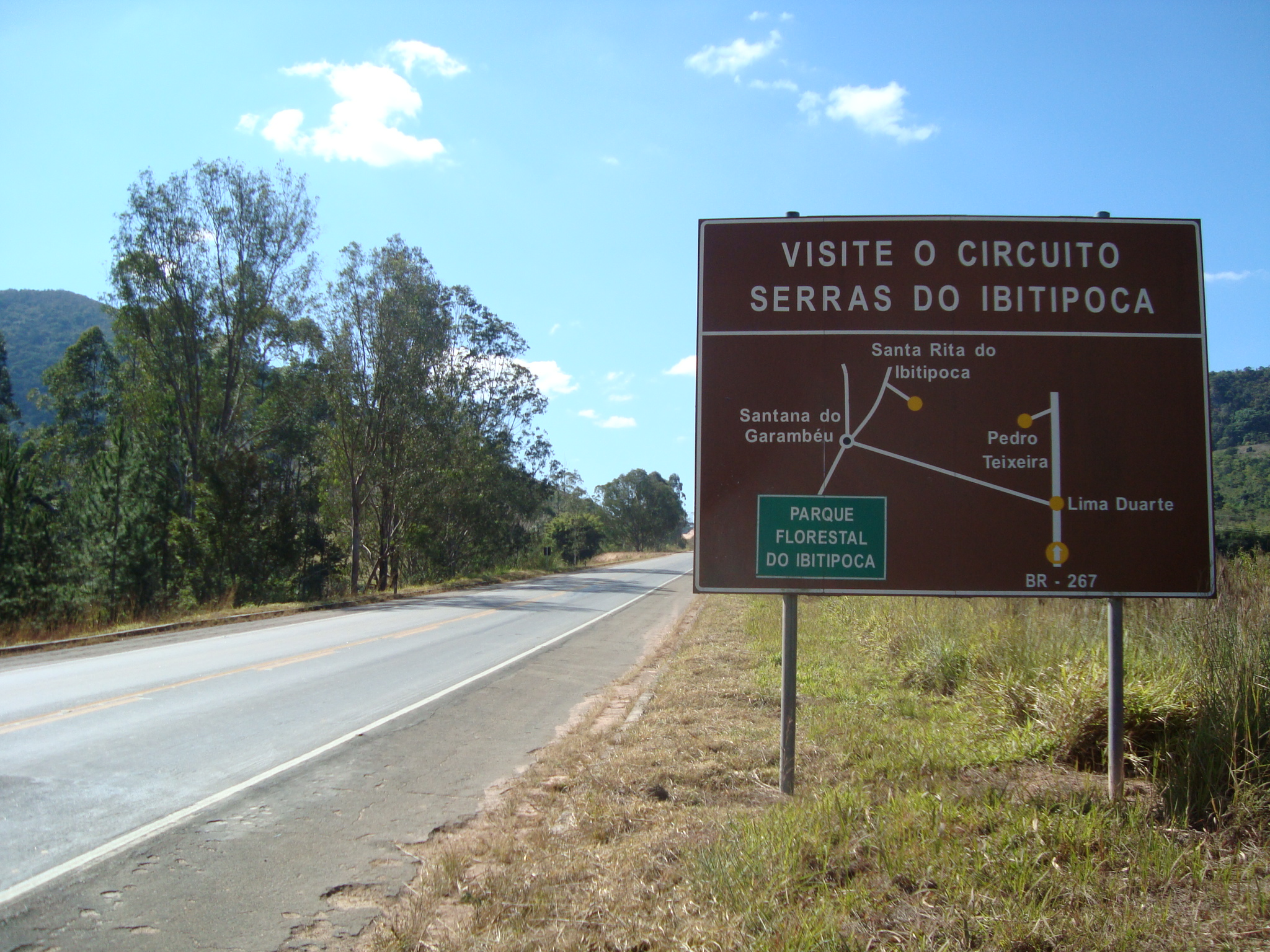
Entry to the park

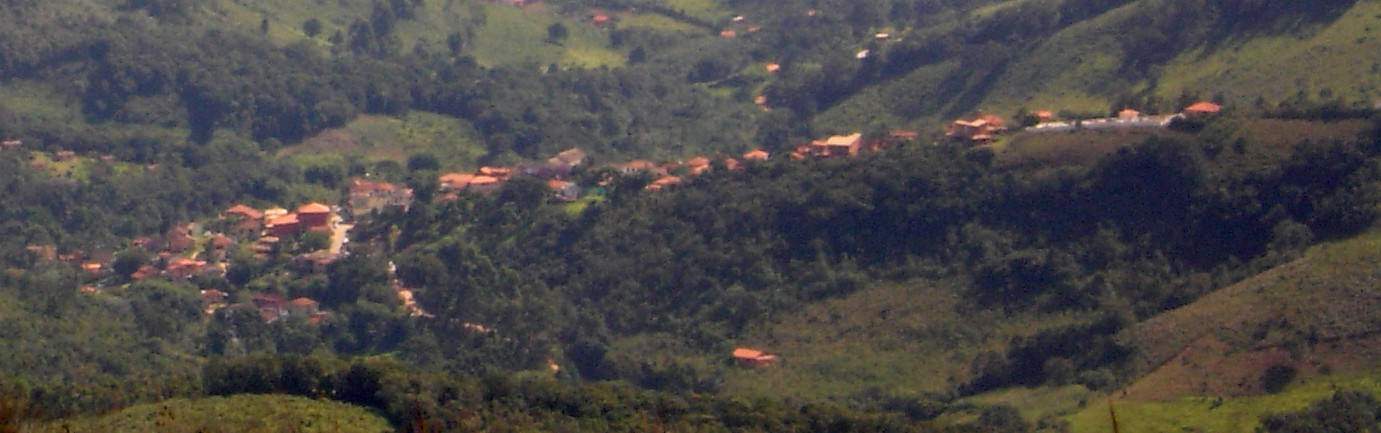
Conceição do Ibitipoca from the park

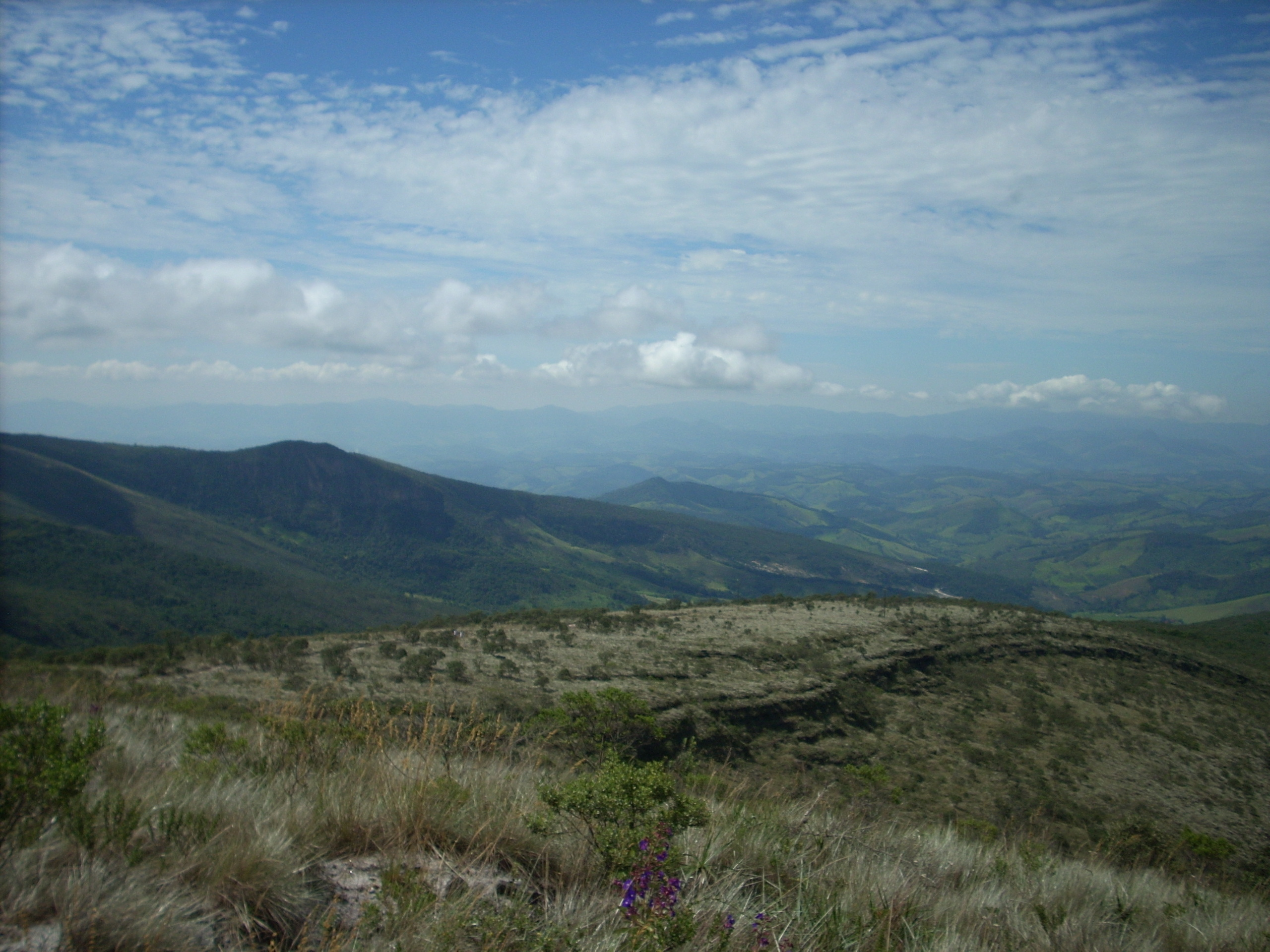
On the trail to Janela da Céu
