= Diffractaic acid =

Chemical compound produced by lichens

Names
- IUPAC name 4-(2,4-dimethoxy-3,6-dimethylbenzoyl)oxy-2-hydroxy-3,6-dimethylbenzoic acid
- Other names Diffractic acid, Dirbizomic acid, Dirhizomic acid, NSC 5901, NSC 685595

Identifiers
CAS Number	436-32-8
3D model (JSmol)	Interactive image
ChEMBL	ChEMBL367741
ChemSpider	85597
PubChem CID	94870
UNII	PD86RC383X
CompTox Dashboard (EPA)	DTXSID40195883
- InChI: InChI=1S/C20H22O7/c1-9-8-14(11(3)17(21)15(9)19(22)23)27-20(24)16-10(2)7-13(25-5)12(4)18(16)26-6/h7-8,21H,1-6H3,(H,22,23) Key: MIJKZXWOOXIEEU-UHFFFAOYSA-N
- SMILES: O=C(O)C1=C(O)C(C)=C(OC(C2=C(OC)C(C)=C(OC)C=C2C)=O)C=C1C

Properties
Chemical formula	C_{20}H_{22}O_{7}
Molar mass	374.389 g·mol^{−1}
- Except where otherwise noted, data are given for materials in their standard state (at 25 °C [77 °F], 100 kPa). Infobox references

Diffractaic acid is a β-orcinol depside with the molecular formula C_{20}H_{22}O_{7}, which is produced by lichens. Diffractaic acid has cytotoxic, cytogenetic, oxidative, analgesic and antiviral effects.

The foliose lichen species Punctelia diffractaica is named for the presence of this compound.
