= Usnic acid =

- Chemical structure of usnic acid

Names
- IUPAC name 2,6-Diacetyl-7,9-dihydroxy-8,9b-dimethyldibenzo[b,d]furan-1,3(2H,9bH)-dione
- Other names: Usneine; Usninic acid; Usniacin

Identifiers
CAS Number	125-46-2 racemic; 7562-61-0 (R)-(+); 6159-66-6 (S)-(–)
3D model (JSmol)	Interactive image
ChEBI	CHEBI:38319
ChEMBL	ChEMBL242022
ChemSpider	5444
ECHA InfoCard	100.004.310
PubChem CID	5646
UNII	0W584PFJ77; 663456969I (R)-(+); 5HYW08F205 (S)-(–)
CompTox Dashboard (EPA)	DTXSID0040123
- InChI: InChI=1S/C18H16O7/c1-6-14(22)12(8(3)20)16-13(15(6)23)18(4)10(25-16)5-9(21)11(7(2)19)17(18)24/h5,11,22-23H,1-4H3 Key: CUCUKLJLRRAKFN-UHFFFAOYSA-N; InChI=1/C18H16O7/c1-6-14(22)12(8(3)20)16-13(15(6)23)18(4)10(25-16)5-9(21)11(7(2)19)17(18)24/h5,11,22-23H,1-4H3 Key: CUCUKLJLRRAKFN-UHFFFAOYAS
- SMILES: CC1=C(C(=C2C(=C1O)C3(C(=CC(=O)C(C3=O)C(=O)C)O2)C)C(=O)C)O

Properties
Chemical formula	C_{18}H_{16}O_{7}
Molar mass	344.319 g·mol^{−1}
Melting point	204 °C (399 °F; 477 K)
Solubility in water	<0.001 g/L (25°C)
Solubility in acetone	0.077 g/L
Solubility in ethyl acetate	0.088 g/L
Solubility in furfural	0.732 g/L
Solubility in furfuryl alcohol	0.121 g/L
- Except where otherwise noted, data are given for materials in their standard state (at 25 °C [77 °F], 100 kPa). verify (what is ?) Infobox references

Usnic acid is a naturally occurring dibenzofuran derivative found in several lichen species with the formula C_{18}H_{16}O_{7}. It was first isolated by German scientist W. Knop in 1844 and first synthesized between 1933 and 1937 by Frank H. Curd and Alexander Robertson. Usnic acid was identified in many genera of lichens including Usnea, Cladonia, Hypotrachyna, Lecanora, Ramalina, Evernia, Parmelia and Alectoria. Although it is generally believed that usnic acid is exclusively restricted to lichens, in a few unconfirmed isolated cases the compound was found in kombucha tea and non-lichenized ascomycetes.

At normal conditions, usnic acid is a bitter, yellow, solid substance. It is known to occur in nature in both the d- and l-forms as well as a racemic mixture. Salts of usnic acid are called usnates (e.g. copper usnate).

== Biological role in lichens ==
Usnic acid is a secondary metabolite in lichens whose role has not been completely elucidated. It is believed that usnic acid protects the lichen from adverse effects of sunlight exposure and deters grazing animals with its bitter taste.

== Biosynthesis ==
Usnic acid is a polyketide biosynthesized via methylphloroacetophenone as an intermediate.

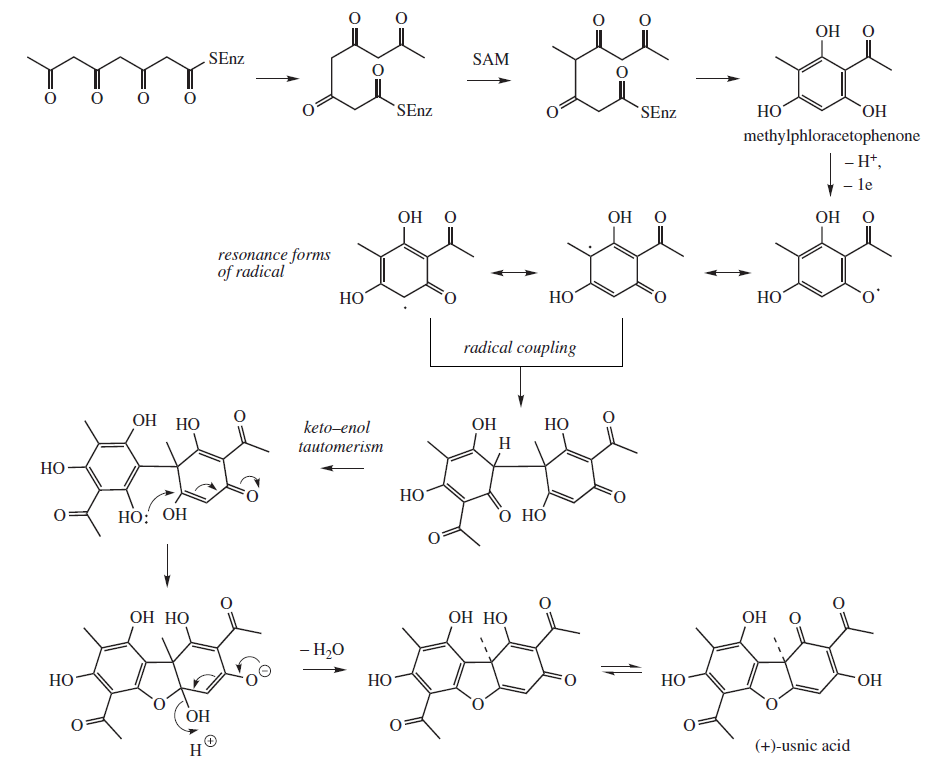
Proposed biosynthesis for usnic acid

== Safety ==
Usnic acid and its salts are idiosyncratically associated with severe hepatotoxicity and liver failure. Daily oral intake of 300–1350 mg over a period of weeks has led to severe hepatotoxicity in a number of persons.

Sodium usnate was one ingredient in a product called "Lipokinetix" that was claimed to induce weight loss via an increase in metabolic rate. Lipokinetix has been the topic of an FDA warning in the USA due to potential hepatotoxicity, although it is unclear yet if any toxicity would be attributable to the aforementioned salt. Lipokinetix also contained norephedrine (PPA), caffeine, yohimbine and 3,5-diiodothyronine.

== Pharmacology ==
Usnic acid has been found to have adrenergic activity in both frog and earthworm nerve junction models in preliminary research.

== Analytics ==
It is possible to determine the content of usnic acid in lichen extract using reversed-polarity capillary zone electrophoresis or high performance liquid chromatography analysis. A spot test using anisaldehyde reagent was developed to detect usnic acid in lichens, producing a distinctive magenta color reaction that works reliably in the presence of most other lichen substances and can aid in identification, particularly in species where visual detection of usnic acid's natural pale yellow color is difficult.
