= Mason Hale =

American lichenologist (1928–1990)

Mason Ellsworth Hale, Jr.
- Born: September 23, 1928
- Died: April 23, 1990 (aged 61)
- Known for: Taxonomy of lichens
- Scientific career
- Institutions: Smithsonian Institution
- Doctoral students: Syo Kurokawa
- Author abbrev. (botany): Hale

Mason Ellsworth Hale, Jr. (September 23, 1929 – April 23, 1990) was one of the most prolific American lichenologists of the 20th century. Many of his scholarly articles focused on the taxonomy of the family Parmeliaceae. Hale was one of the first lichen experts to incorporate secondary chemistry and technology such as computers and scanning electron microscopy into taxonomic work. Mason Hale published approximately two hundred articles and books on various aspects of lichen biology including taxonomy, anatomy, chemistry, and ecology. Hale also wrote several books aimed at education and increasing accessibility to lichens.

== Early life and education ==
Mason Hale Jr. grew up on a farm outside of Winsted, Connecticut. He had an affinity towards biology from experiences from living on his family's farm. As an undergraduate, Hale wanted to be a linguist, but was not able to take specialized classes. Instead, he earned an undergraduate degree studying biology at Yale University, where he studied lichens under Alexander W. Evans, a bryophyte and lichen expert.

Hale earned his Master's and Ph.D. at the University of Wisconsin–Madison under the supervision of prominent lichenologist John W. Thomson, an arctic lichen expert. For his master's degree, Hale studied the lichen flora of the Baffin Islands, located in northeastern Canada. He collected lichens on the island working with Pierre Dansereau, a prominent Canadian ecologist. The resulting publications from the Baffin Islands contained both a checklist of all species collected, and dichotomous keys. Baffin Island was the first of many expeditions around the world that Hale made to collect lichens.

For his Ph.D. Hale studied the lichens of southern Wisconsin. The paper, which was published in the journal Ecology, exemplifies Hale's ability to use technology to innovate new ideas. He studied how cryptogam communities (lichens and bryophytes) change with differing forest composition. He also examined host specificity of species. Hale found that there are different communities at the base of the tree compared to 1.3 meters high on the tree trunk. Another significant finding was that the cryptogamic community differed between habitats due to light and other stand level variables. This was an important study because it was one of the first lichen experiments that utilized statistics for ecological conclusions as opposed to observations. Also Hale placed the data for each tree on IBM punch cards to better analyze the data.

Hale met his wife Beatrice Wilde, an ecologist, while at the University of Wisconsin. They married in 1952 and had three children, Janet, Sandra and Robert. Hale also befriended William Culberson, a fellow graduate student, and later a lichen expert at Duke University. Hale and Culberson collaborated on many chemistry and taxonomic endeavors including the first lichen checklist of North America.

After earning his Ph.D., Hale worked for two years each at University of Wichita and University of West Virginia. At that time he started to edit the exsiccata series Lichenes Americani exsiccati, collected and published by M. E. Hale. Then he became an Associate Curator at the Smithsonian Institution, where he worked from 1957 until his death. In 33 years at the Smithsonian, Hale collected close to 80,000 specimens and made the Smithsonian Institution one of the largest lichen herbariums in the world. Hale made numerous expeditions to tropical regions including the Caribbean, Central and South America, Asia, and Africa. One of his favorite expeditions was to collect endolithic lichens in Antarctica. Hale was later appointed a Senior Botanist at the Smithsonian.

In 1986, during an International Association for Lichenology field excursion to Namibia and South Africa, Hale surveyed the lichen desert and nearby volcanic outcrops; contemporaries recalled his energetic collecting there, including abundant material of Santessonia, a genus he had earlier described. He was invited to the 1989 London symposium on tropical lichenology but was too ill to attend; he died shortly afterwards, aged 61.

== Advances in chemistry and technology ==
Mason Hale was primarily a taxonomist, but his taxonomic framework and methodology for describing new species was dependent on modern technology. Hale was one of the first lichen experts to use chemical tests to study species delineations. He learned the techniques from his professor at Yale University, Alexander W. Evans. The techniques that he utilized included spot tests, early thin layer chromatography, and fluorescence (turning of color with UV light). Hale both cataloged the presence of chemicals from numerous North American species and described new chemicals. One example, is Hale's study on fluorescence in which he linked fluoresced colors to specific chemicals using paper chromatography.

In addition to chemistry, Hale also incorporated scanning electron microscopy characteristics such as cortical structure into his species concepts. Another technical advance Hale utilized was punch card computers to keep track of morphological and ecological data. The use of computers was especially important to keep track of the many traits and taxonomic revisions in the Parmeliaceae.

== Taxonomic works ==
Mason Hale was an expert of the Parmeliaceae, a large family of foliose lichens. Hale wrote numerous monographs and articles describing new genera and species. Before Hale, Parmelia was a large genus containing a wide range of morphological traits. Hale became interested in the Parmeliaceae because there was a number of undescribed species in the southeastern United States. Hale revised the family three times. The first time required reviewing type specimens and collected material to examine subgeneric concepts and synonyms. The second and third revisions broke the subgenera into more specific genera based on differences in chemistry and morphological characteristics using scanning electron microscopy. While initially met with resistance, most of the taxonomic changes are now widely accepted. Hale's taxonomic divisions are considered to be one of his most important contribution to lichenology.

Hale also widely collected and described crustose lichens in the Graphidaceae and Thelotremataceae (now synonymized with Graphidaceae).

== Ecology ==
Hale pioneered numerous ecological measurements with lichens. In 1959 he marked out plots for long-term study of the lichens on Plummers Island and used photographs to assess growth rates. In addition to his work on community ecology of lichens, Hale examined the yearly growth rate of lichens in Aton Forest. Hale also examined use of lichens as an indicator of floods and high water. Lastly in the 1980s Hale and James D. Lawrey published articles examining how car exhaust (specifically the lead in the exhaust) negatively affects lichen growth. The long-term datasets from Plummers Island facilitated these studies.

== Education and outreach ==
Hale also wrote or co-authored books that helped to introduce lichens to the general public and keep scientists abreast of current theory. These books contained keys to genera and species such as How to know the Lichens and Lichens of California. An important symposia on current topics was The Lichens. Introductory texts to lichen study include Biology of Lichens. Hale and Culberson also compiled the first checklist to North American lichens and lichenicolous fungi in 1956. Lastly, Hale and his son printed the newsletters for the International Association for Lichenology on old printing presses and made the typesetting by hand.

== Statistics and awards ==
According to Google Scholar, Mason Hale wrote approximately 200 peer-reviewed journal articles and has been cited over 4,800 times. Notable scientists who studied under Hale were: Paula DePriest, Theodore L. Esslinger, and Syo Kurokawa. Many additional scientists were mentored by Hale including, Bruce McCune and Roger Rosentreter. Hale served as president of the International Association of Lichenologists (IAL) from 1981 to 1987. In his memory, the IAL created the Mason Hale Award for best doctoral study. The Bryologist, a peer-reviewed journal, dedicated the entire Autumn 1993 issue as a memoriam.

== Eponymous taxa and other legacy ==
The following are a partial list of species named after Mason Hale. The list focuses primarily on North American taxa:

- Abrothallus halei
- Cladonia halei
- Graphis haleana
- Hypotrachyna mason-halei
- Melanohalea halei
- Phyllopsora halei
- Physcia halei
- Pseudocyphellaria halei
- Thelotrema halei
- Usnea halei
- Xanthoparmelia halei

The following are a partial list of genera named after Mason Hale. The list focuses primarily on North American taxa:

- Halecania
- Halegrapha
- Haleomyces
- Masonhalea
- Melanohalea

The Hale Valley in Antarctica is named after him.

In 1993, the International Association for Lichenology instituted the Mason E. Hale Award to recognise research excellence in lichenologists based on their recently-awarded doctoral thesis or similar publication.
