= Acuario de Veracruz =

Biggest aquarium in Mexico and Latin America

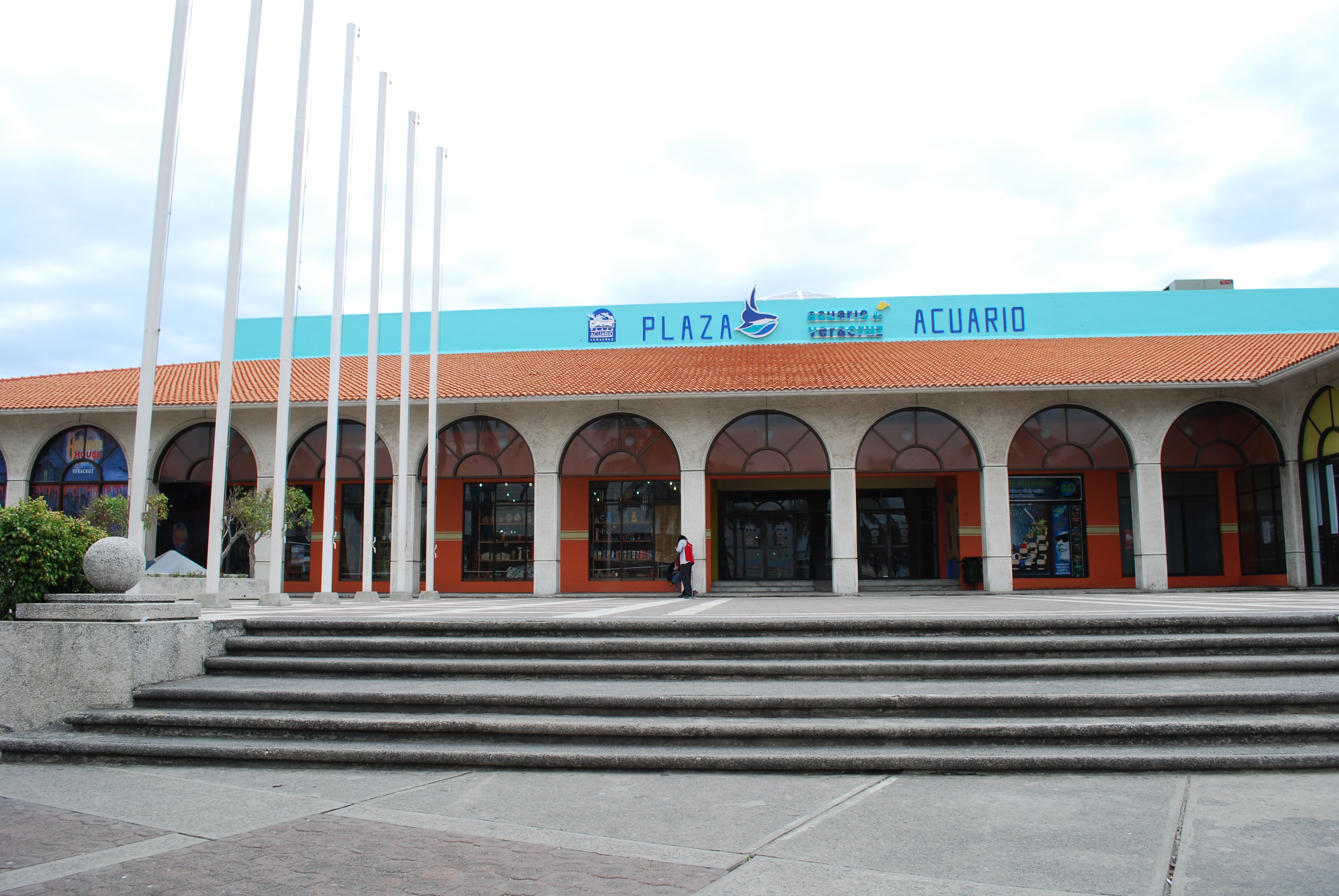
- Interactive map of Acuario de Veracruz
- 19°11′13.7″N 96°7′21.18″W
- Date opened: November 13, 1992
- Location: Blvd. Manuel Ávila Camacho, Ricardo Flores Magón, 91900 Veracruz, Ver.
- Land area: 7500 m^{2}
- No. of animals: 3,500
- No. of species: 250
- Total volume of tanks: 7 million liters
- Website: acuariodeveracruz.com

The Acuario de Veracruz (Veracruz Aquarium) is a public aquarium located in the city of Veracruz. It is the biggest aquarium in Mexico and Latin America by water volume, with 7 million liters of water.

== History ==
On the end of the 1980s, talks with the Government of the State of Veracruz were started about the creation of an aquarium that would exhibit local species and boost tourism. In November 1990, the construction of the aquarium started on the Playón de Hornos, place chosen due to its closeness to the touristic area of the city and to its closeness to a nearby source of water.

The building was led by Luis Kasuga Osaka, which is regarded as the founder of the aquarium, and Hiroshi Kamio, who also designed the aquarium. The construction was finished on the final months of 1992, and the aquarium was inaugurated on November 13, 1992. The initial building had an area of 3,500 square meters.

A first phase of enlargement was held in the year 2000, which included a shark tank, a manatee tank and a terrace in the exterior part of the aquarium. In 2009, the dolphinarium was inaugurated with research and conservation purposes.

After six months of construction and an investment of 25 million Mexican pesos, in 2014 the penguinarium was opened to public.

== Exhibits ==
The Veracruz Aquarium features 9 exhibits, which in total contain more than 250 different species and 3,500 animals.

=== Selva de los Tuxtlas ===
The first exhibit of the aquarium recreates the jungle zone of the Los Tuxtlas, south of the state of Veracruz, with a waterfall that falls to a pond. A trait of the Selva de los Tuxtlas exhibit are the jungle trees, in which keel-billed toucans and blue-and-yellow macaws can be seen. Among the species found on the Selva de los Tuxtlas are the boa constrictor and diverse specimens of freshwater turtles.

=== Freshwater Gallery ===
The gallery has a total volume of 562,177 liters divided in several tanks. More than 30 species of freshwater fishes, reptiles and mammals with origins from the Amazon River, Asia, Africa, and several regions of North America are found on the gallery. The Veracruz Aquarium is the only aquarium that exhibits blind cave fish, in a tank that holds the shape of a typical cavern in San Luis Potosí. Other species exhibited on this gallery are pejelagartos, arowanas and koi carps.

=== Reef Tank ===
The reef tank has a cylindrical form, with 13 acrylic windows surrounding 1,250,000 liters of saltwater. Approximately 20 species from the Veracruzano Coral Reef System National Park are exhibited in this tank, including nurse sharks and groupers that have lived more than 17 years, barracudas, white skates and tarpons.

=== Saltwater Gallery ===
The saltwater gallery contains 14 tanks with more than 60 specimens, including fishes and invertebrates from the Gulf of Mexico, Indian and Pacific Ocean, Red Sea and Australia. The aquarium also has a live food laboratory in this area, where brine shrimp is grown, used to feed the smaller fishes from the gallery. Every tank contains filtration systems with mechanical, biological filters and UV reactors that maintain the water in optimal conditions. Green morays, Caribbean spiny lobsters, remoras, lionfishes and blue tangs are some of the species that are found on the saltwater gallery.

=== Shark Tank ===
The shark tank has a volume of 919,000 liters and contains the installations to hold large specimens. Since 2004, an acrylic box became open to the public in order to dive into the tank. Two main shark species are found in the shark tank: sandbar sharks and tiger sharks.

The Veracruz Aquarium has stood out worldwide for its tiger sharks, which have been kept for periods longer than 7 years. These sharks are exhibited temporarily, as after some time in captivity the tiger sharks are released and tracked by satellite.

=== Jellyfish Tanks ===
Opened in 2005, the jellyfish tanks were the first jellyfish exhibit in Latin America. There are 7 species from the coasts of Veracruz and the Gulf of Mexico on the exhibit, including the moon jellyfish, cannonball jellyfish, and the upside-down jellyfish. The gallery contains tanks specifically designed for the jellyfish, with rounded shapes that can facilitate currents and would avoid damaging the organisms. It was also needed to install sophisticated filtration systems that would guarantee the quality of the water, monitored daily.

=== Manatee Tank ===
In 1998, the aquarium started keeping West Indian manatees, as the first two orphan manatees arrived from the Alvarado Lagoon. Since then, seven manatee specimens have been rehabilitated, and in 2004 the first calf in captivity was born. As of 2020, another two manatee calves have successfully born in the installations. The manatees can be observed from two points, firstly underwater and then above water, where they usually eat lettuce.

=== Dolphinarium ===
First of its kind in Mexico, the dolphinarium was opened to the public in 2009. It counts with a main tank and two holding tanks in total the dolphinarium holds 2,500,000 liters of saltwater, with filtration systems and monitoring at every time. At one side of the main tank a clinical laboratory is found, with instrumentation where blood samples can be taken and analyzed from the dolphins. The species of dolphins at the aquarium are common bottlenose dolphins.

=== Penguinarium ===
The penguinarium was inaugurated on July 15, 2014, the first in Mexico. The Humboldt penguins can be observed underwater, as well as over the rocks where they can rest. The temperature of the penguinarium must be maintained between 17 and 19 degrees Celsius, and fed with the Peruvian anchoveta. As of 2017, 22 penguins were born in the Veracruz Aquarium, as well as the first penguin born in Mexico.

== Gallery ==
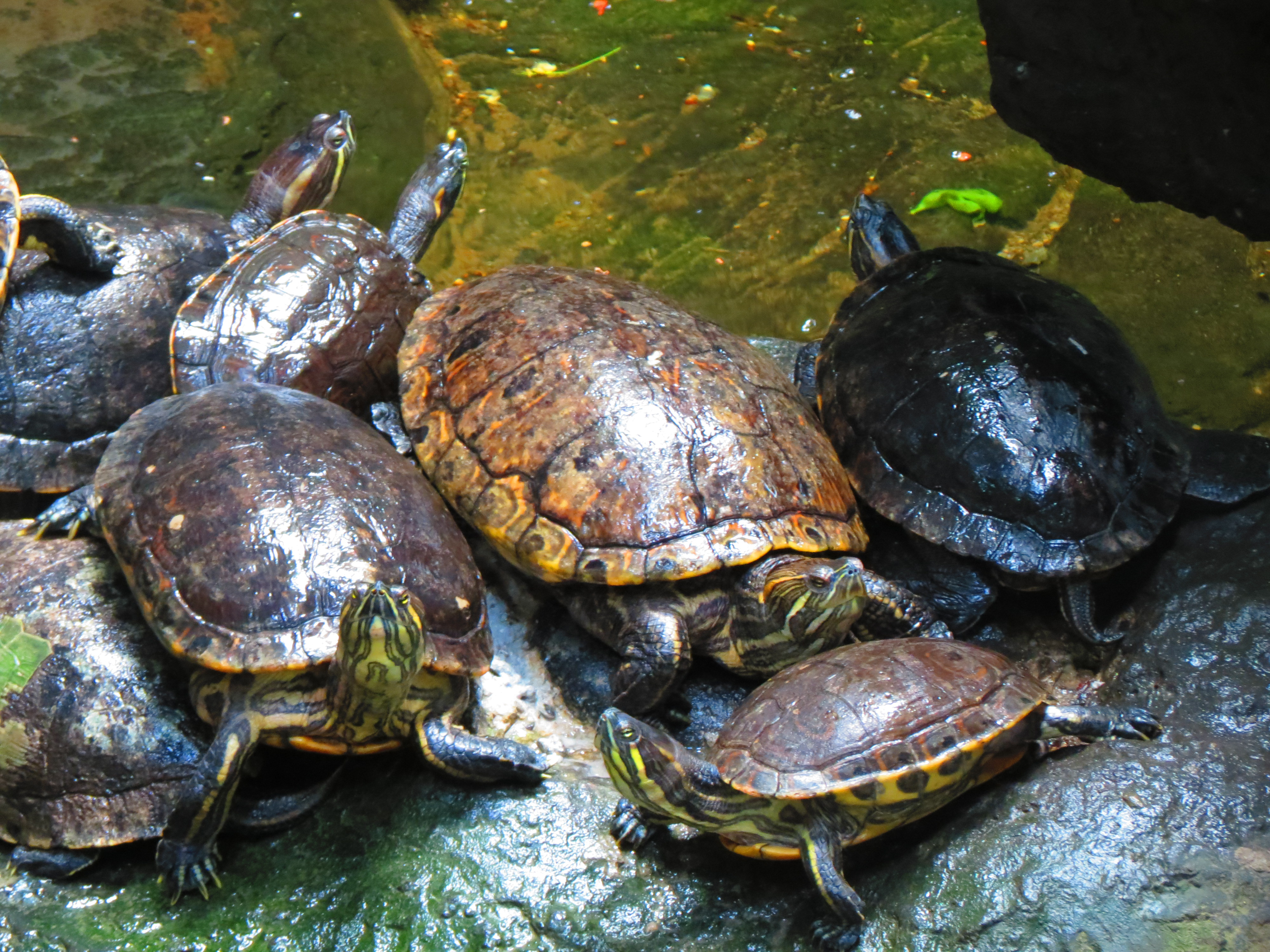
Freshwater turtles at the Selva de los Tuxtlas exhibit.

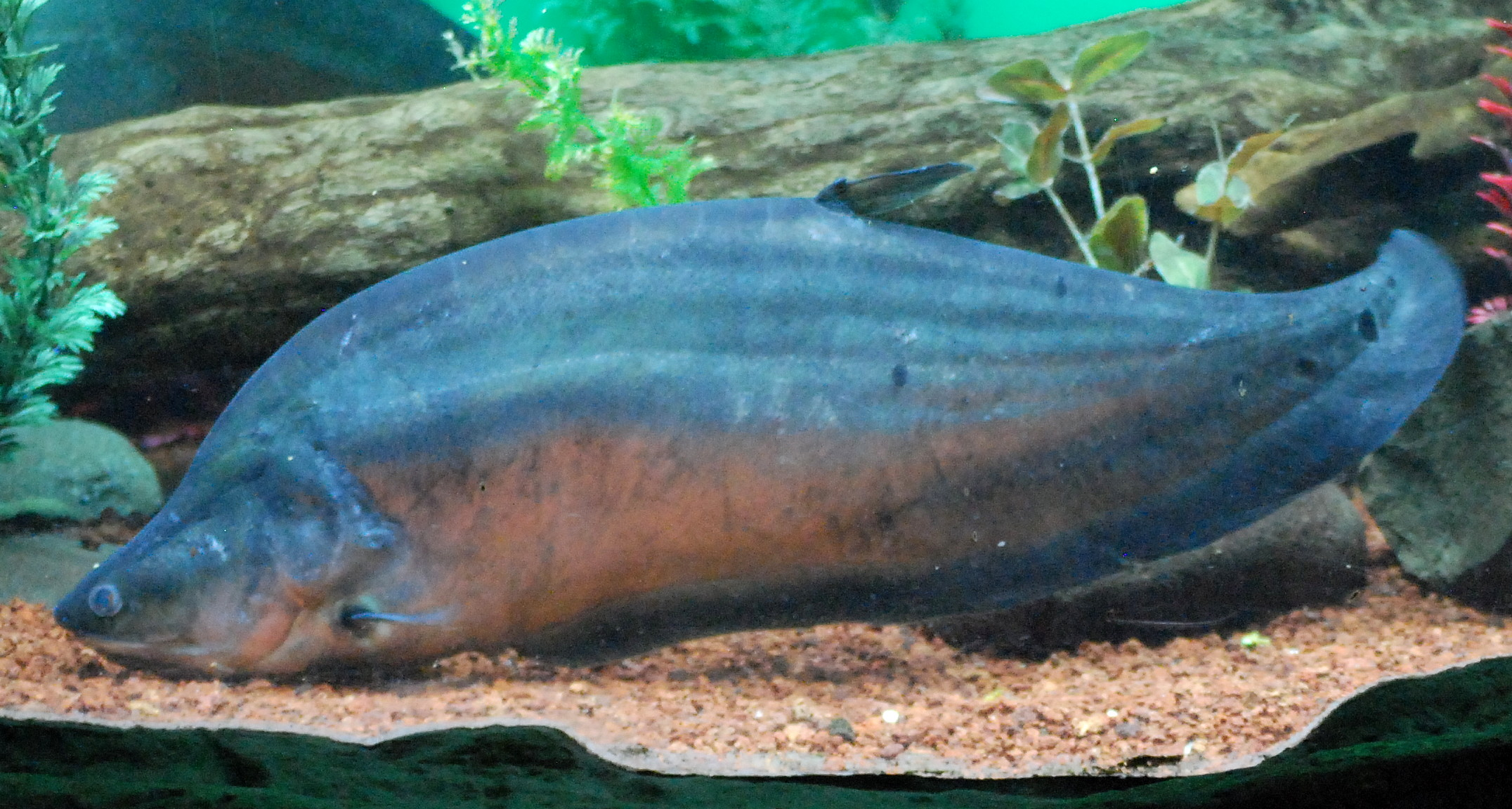
Clown featherback

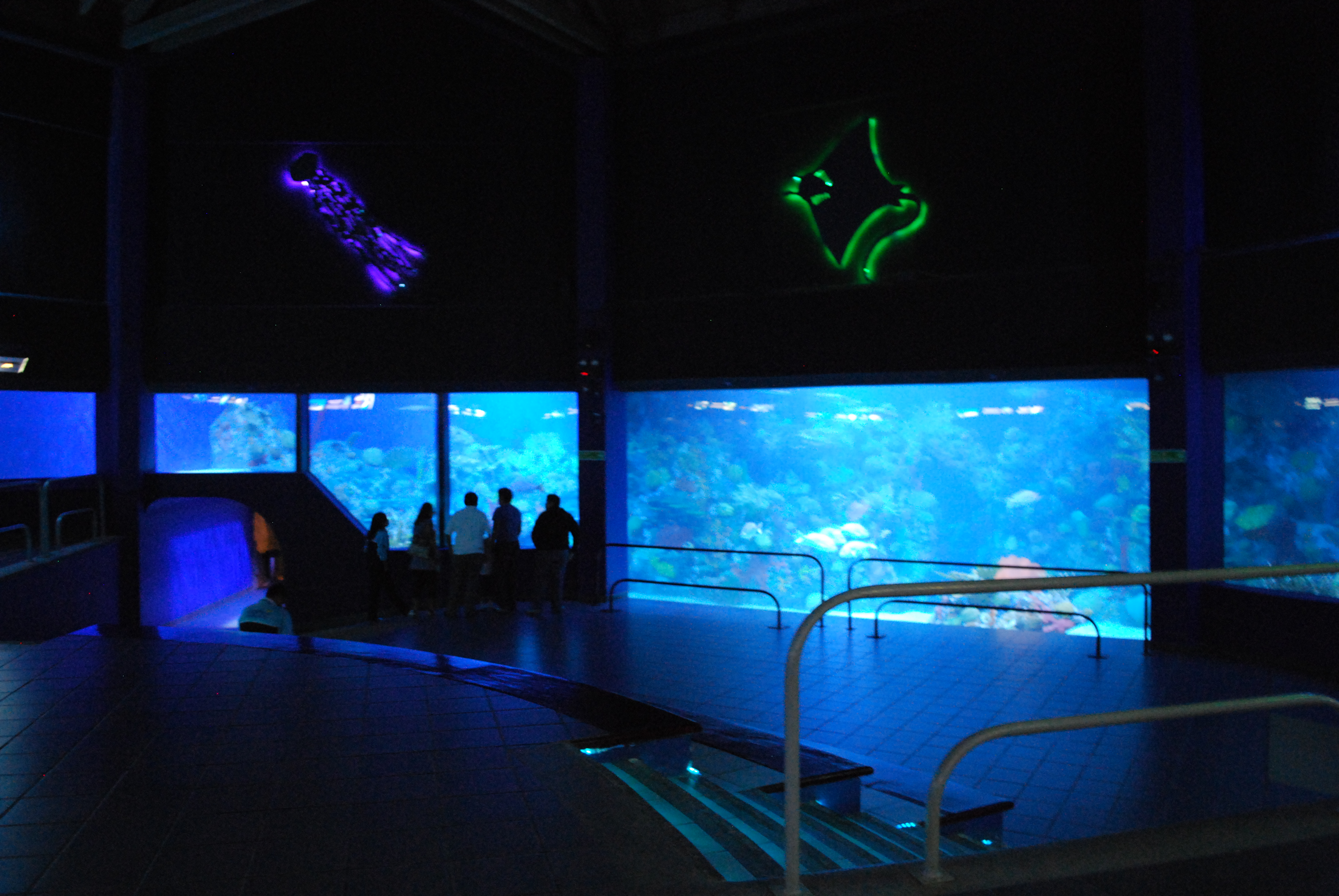
Reef Tank.

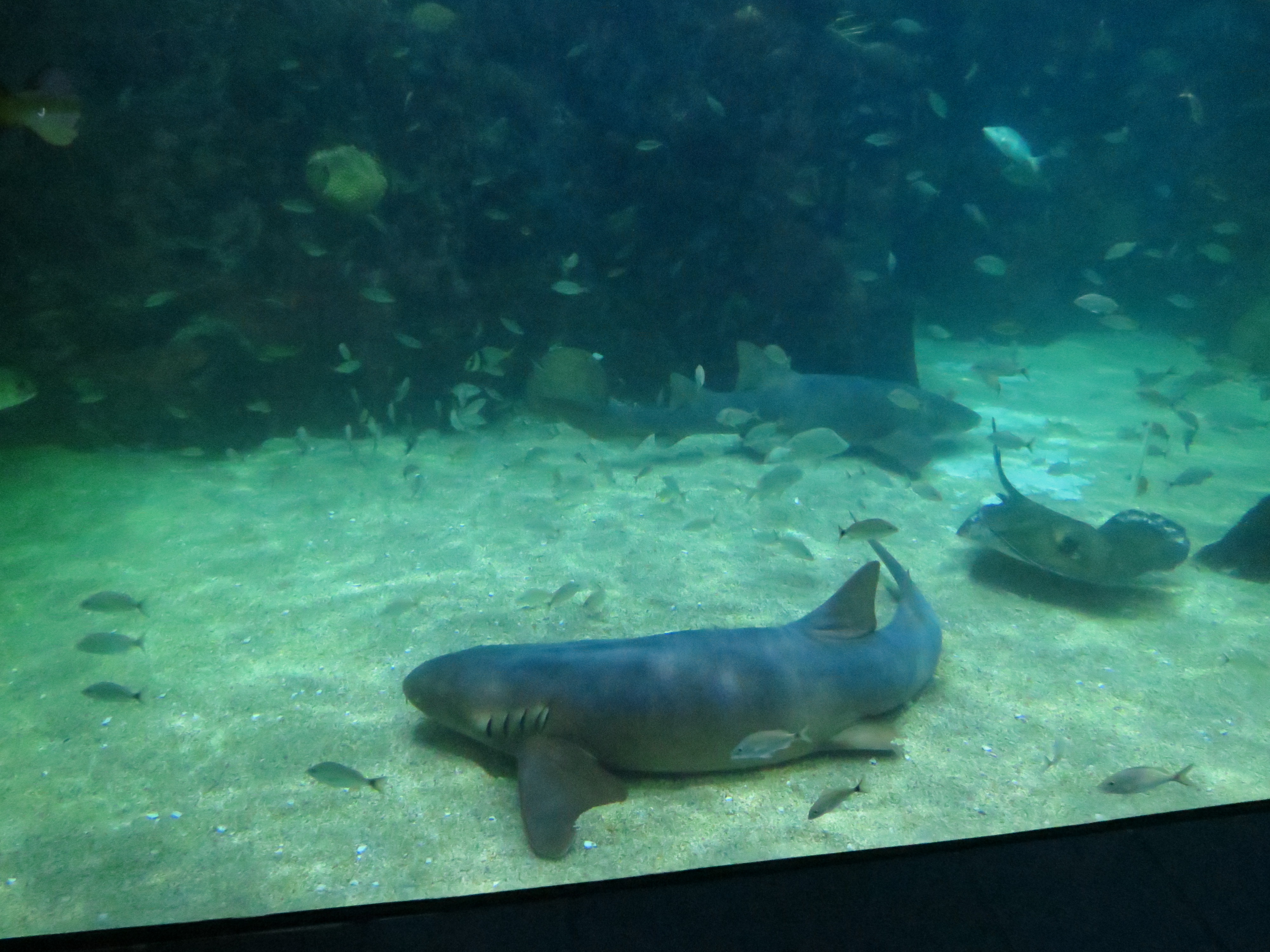
Nurse sharks and a white skate under a school of fish.

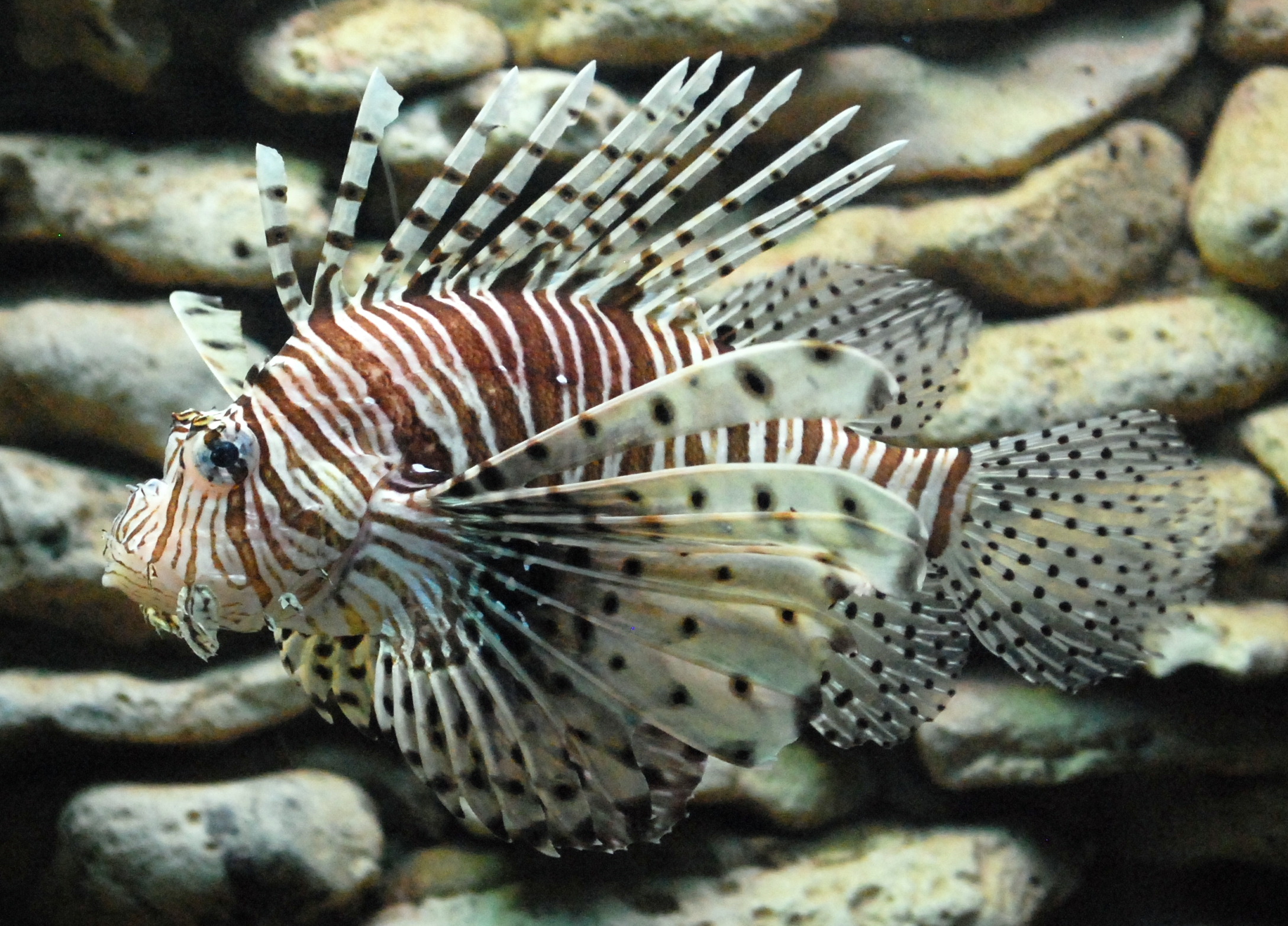
Lionfish

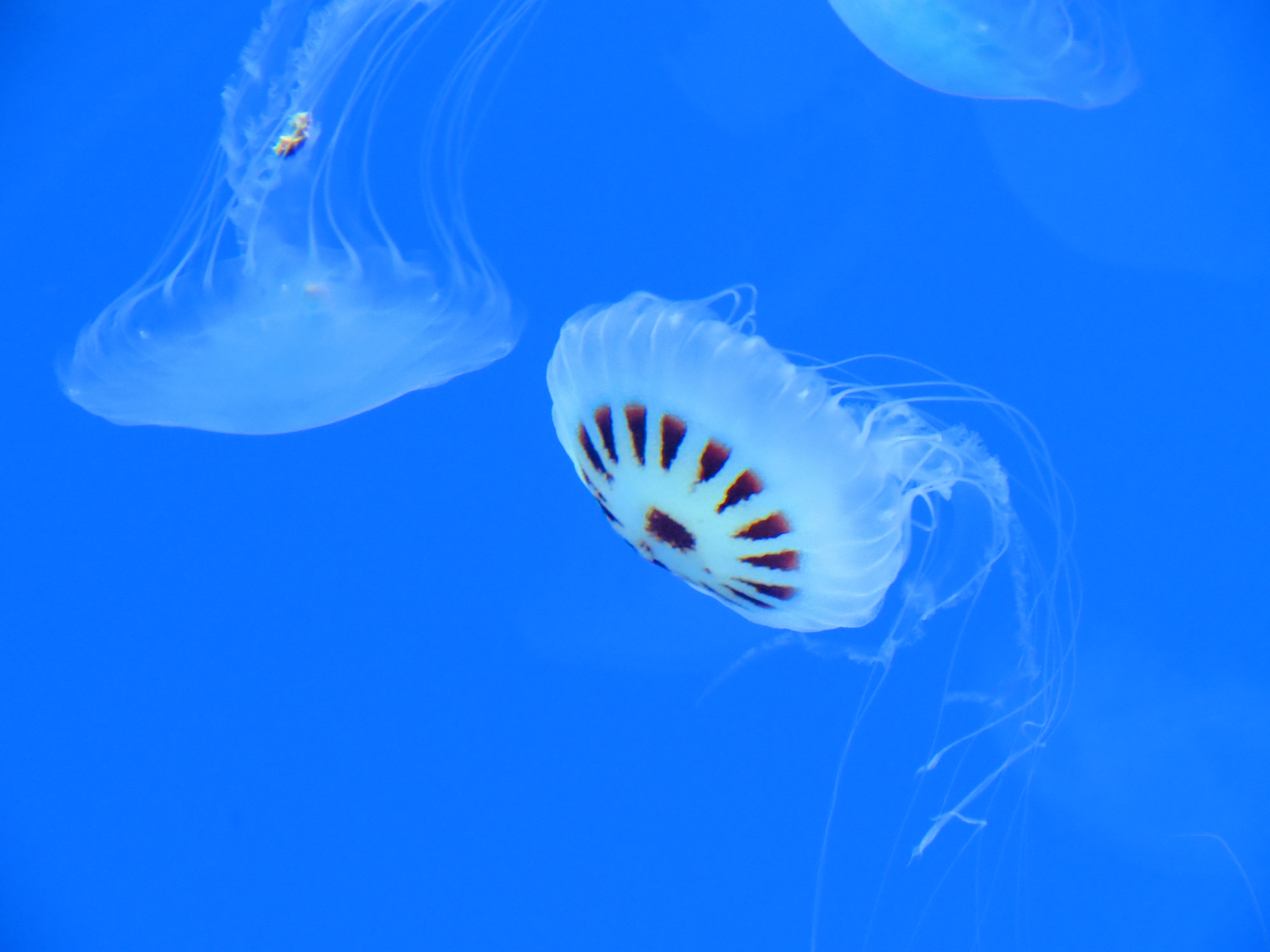
Atlantic sea nettles

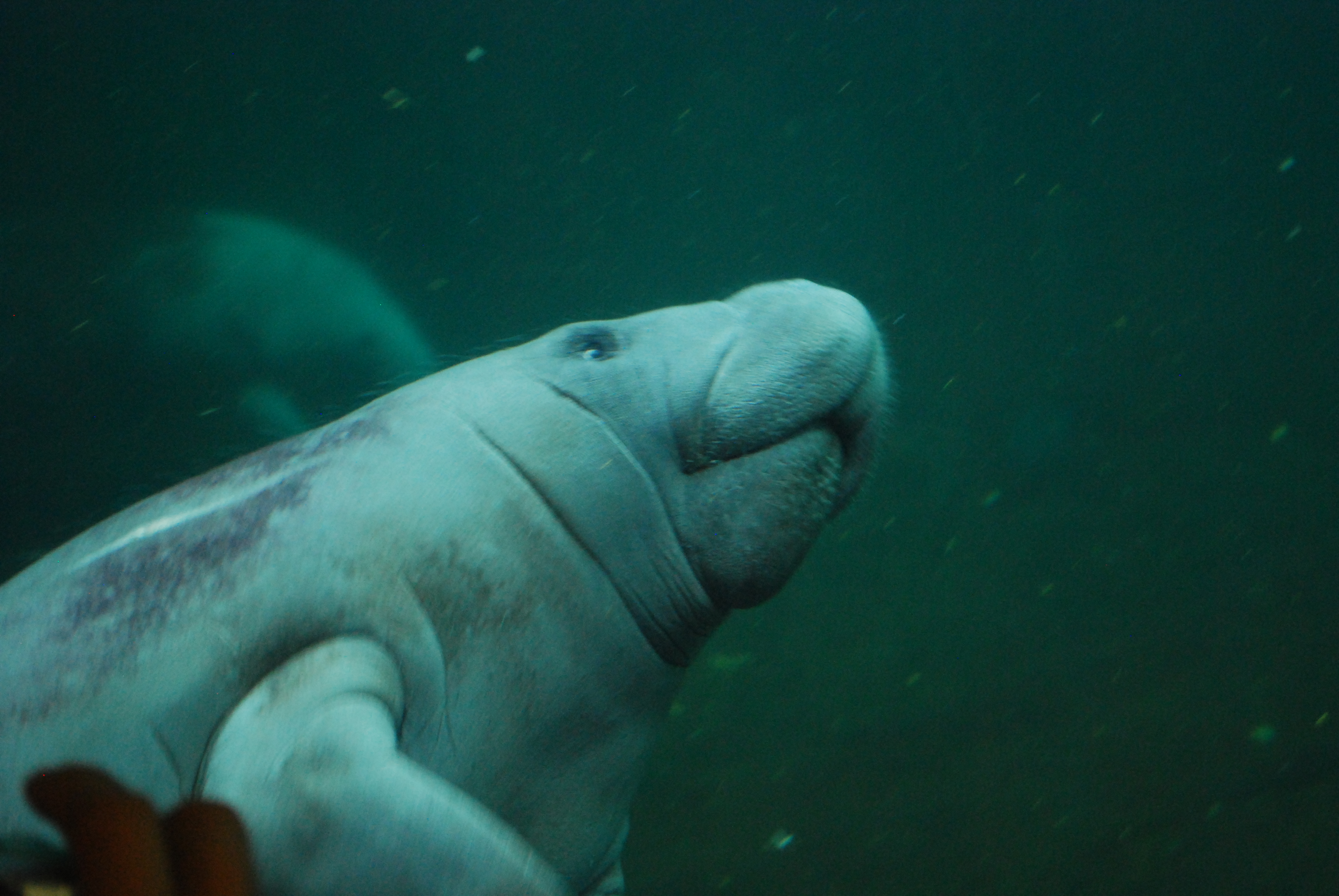
West Indian manatee

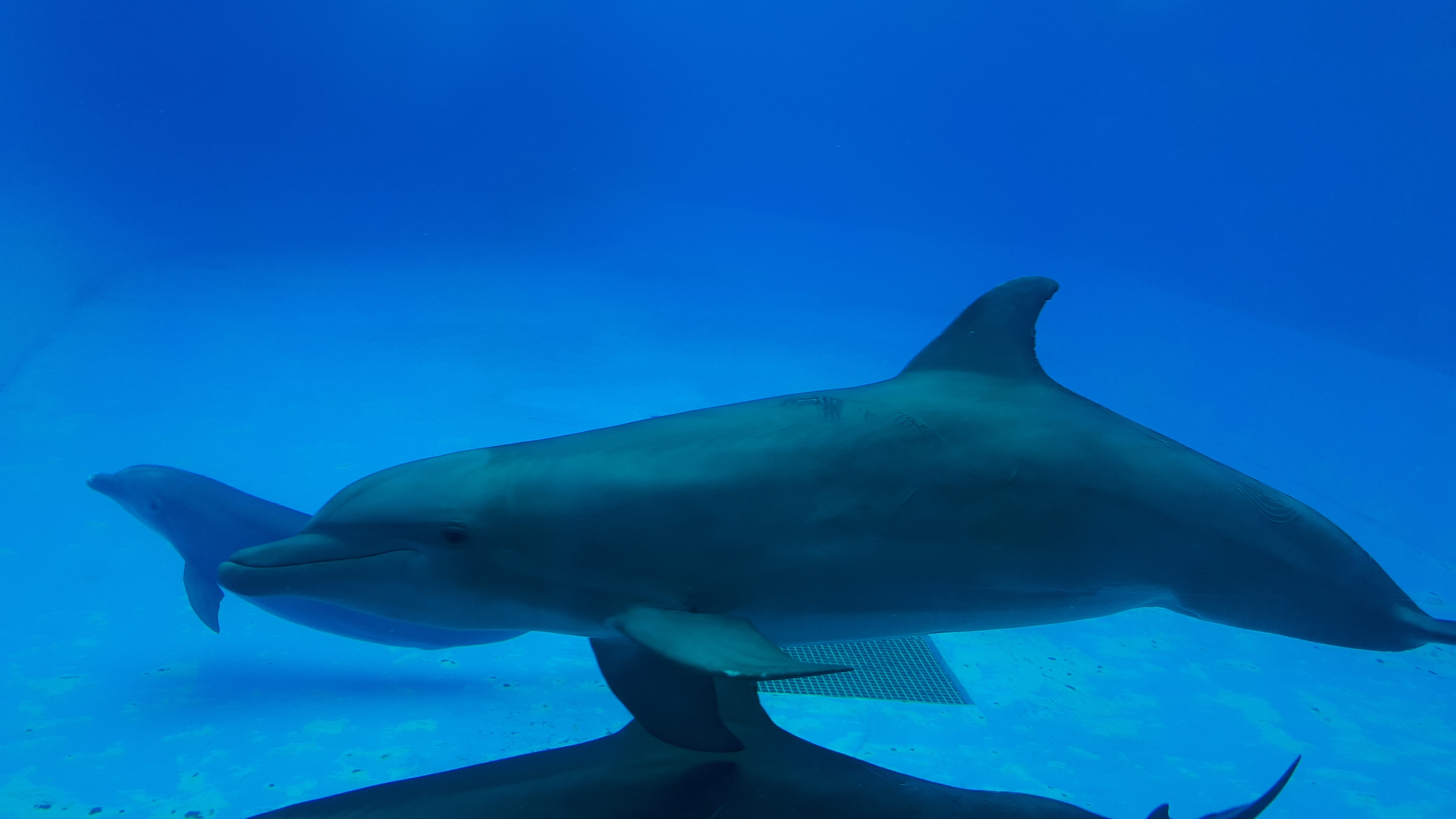
Common bottlenose dolphins

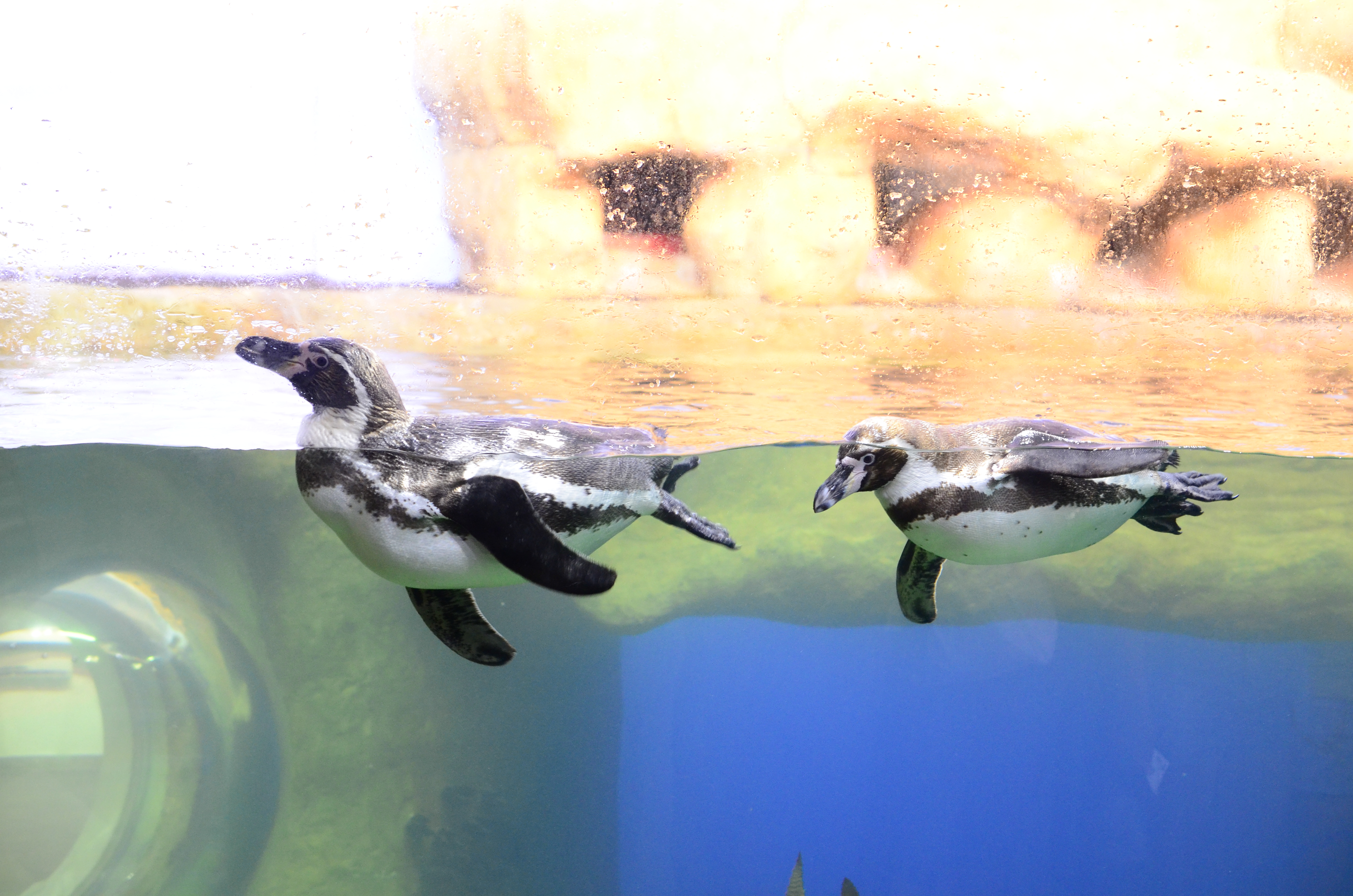
Humboldt penguins

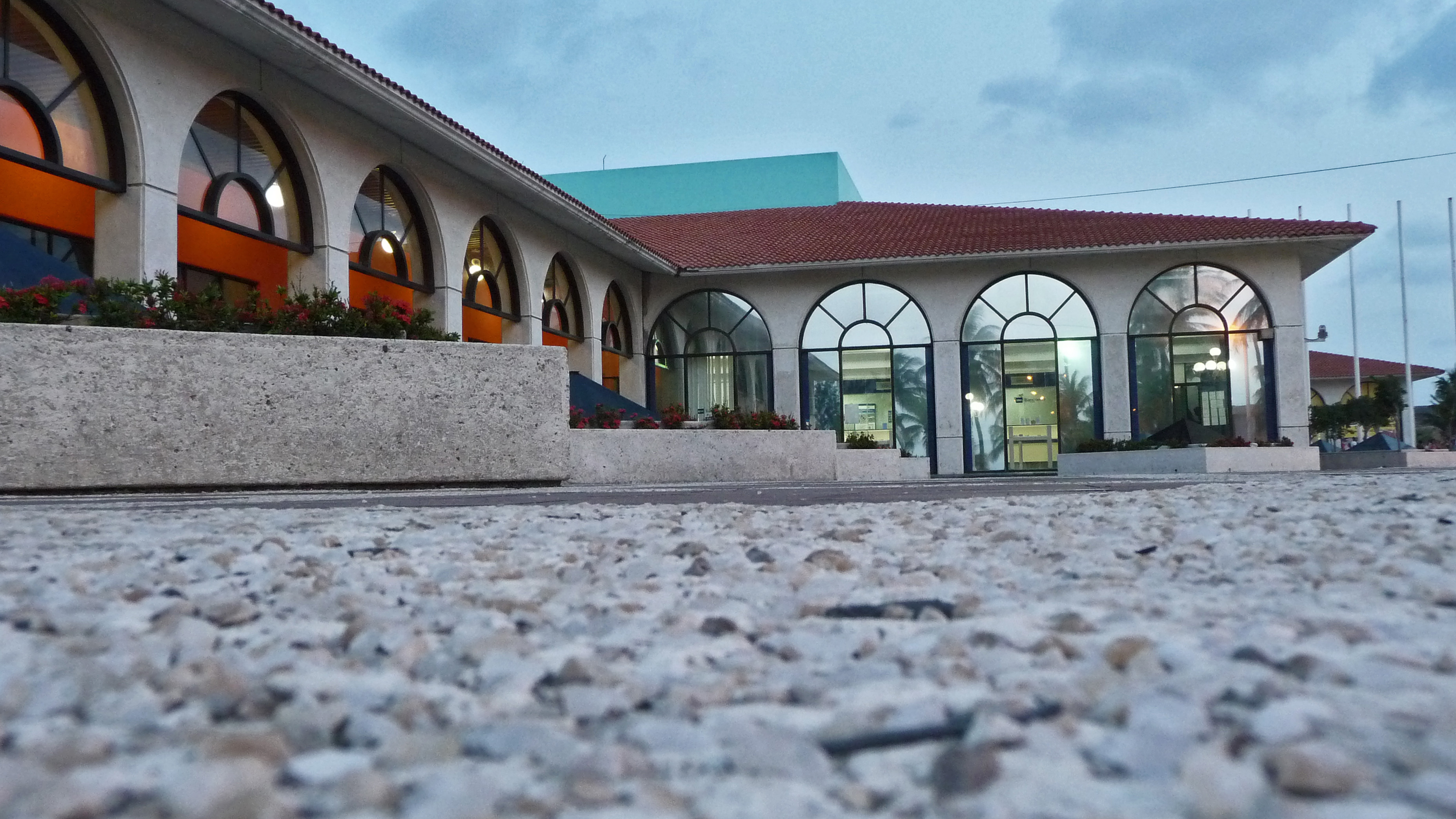
Outside of the aquarium
