= Orchidarium =

Orchidarium may refer to:

- A vivarium, specifically for the cultivation of orchids
- An area in a park or botanical garden dedicated to orchids
