= Vivarium =

Area for keeping and raising animals or plants

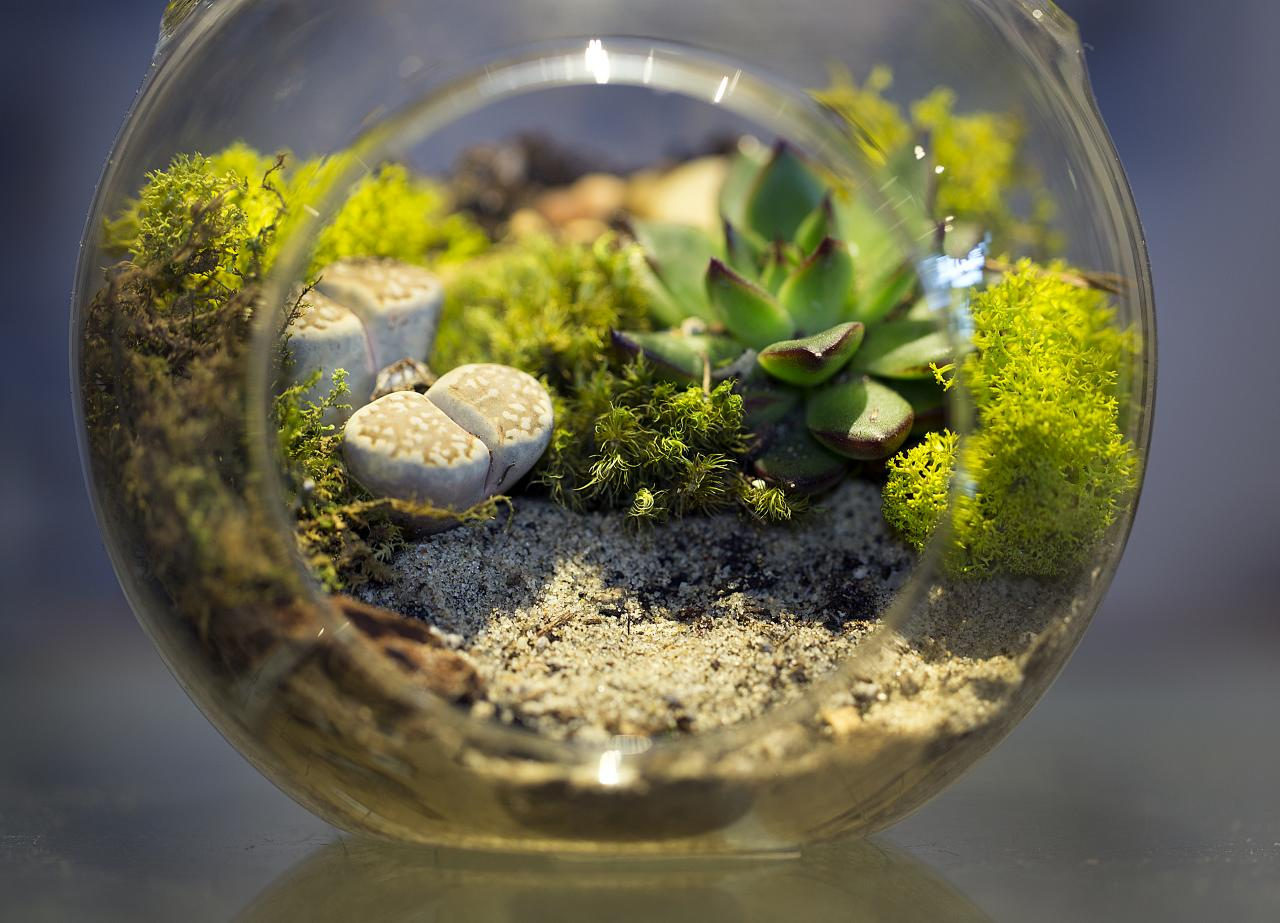
A miniature home terrarium.

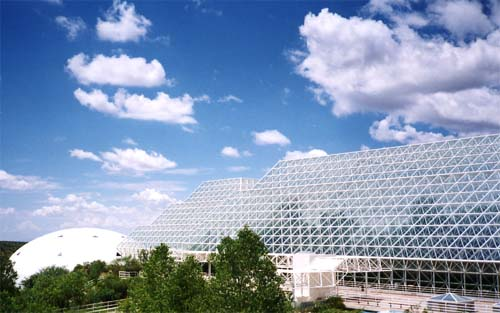
Biosphere 2 in Oracle, Arizona

A vivarium (Latin for 'place of life'; pl. vivaria or vivariums) is an area, usually enclosed, for keeping and raising animals or plants for observation or research. Water-based vivaria may have open tops providing they are not connected to other water bodies. An animal enclosure is considered a vivarium only if it provides quality of life through naturalistic components such as ample living space and natural decor that allow and encourage natural behaviours. Often, a portion of the ecosystem for a particular species is simulated on a smaller scale, with controls for environmental conditions such as temperature, humidity and light.

A vivarium may be small enough to sit on a desk or table, such as a terrarium or an aquarium, or may be a very large structure, possibly outdoors. Large vivaria, particularly those holding organisms capable of flight, typically include some sort of a dual-door mechanism such as a sally port for entry and exit, so that the outer door can be closed to prevent escape before the inner door is opened.

== Types ==
Some vivaria can be subcategorized according to the habitat or lifeforms enclosed within. A vivarium that contains multiple components may be named according to its primary component, or simply called a vivarium. Each subcategory can refer to either an individual enclosure, or a facility that encompasses numerous like enclosures.

=== Aquarium ===
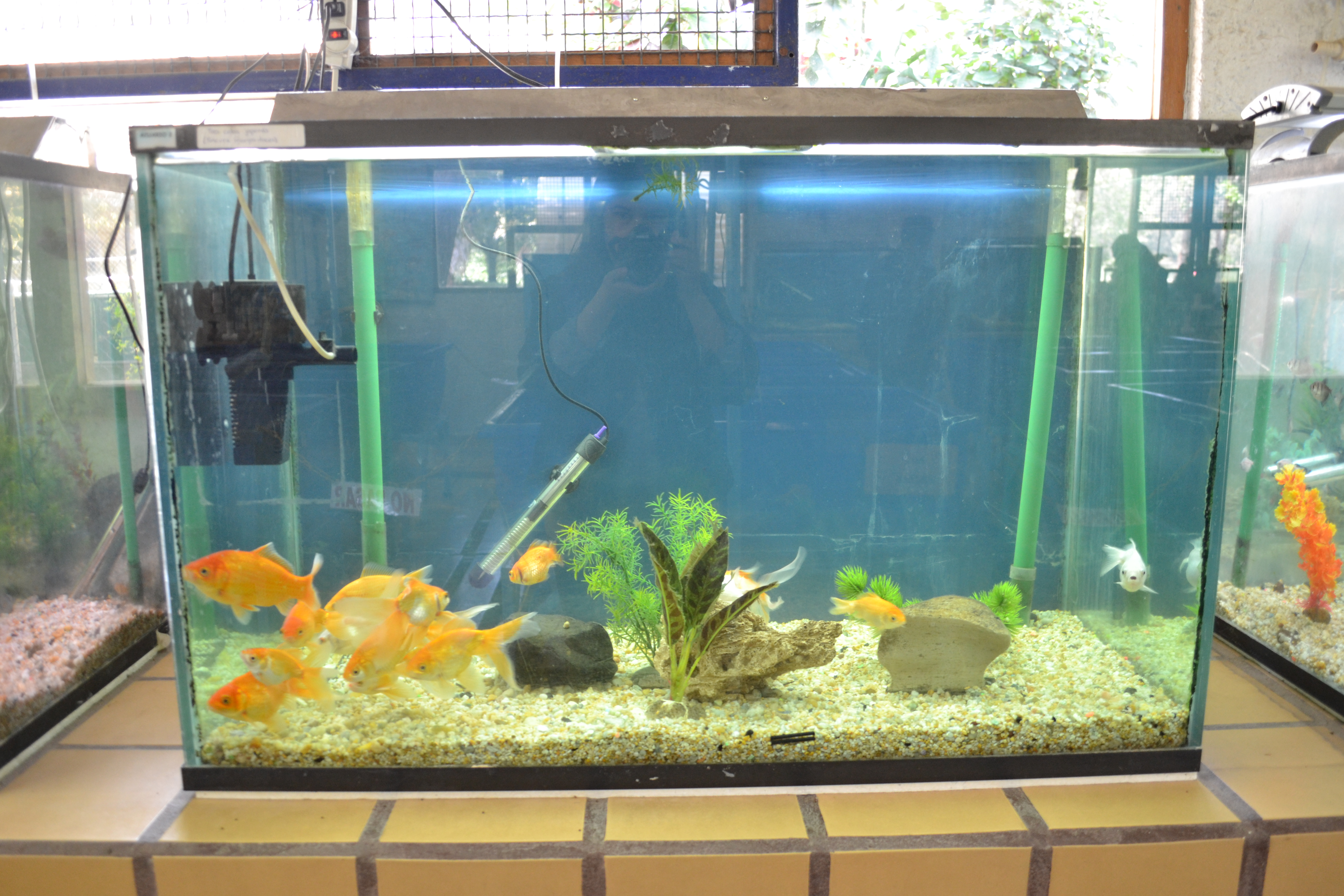
Goldfish in an aquarium

An aquarium (aqua = water) is a water-filled enclosure housing aquatic plants and/or animals such as fish. A bioactive aquarium would additionally house micro-organisms such as beneficial bacteria, and janitor animal species such as caridean shrimp, boxer shrimp, algae-eating snails and burrowing snails. At least one side of an aquarium is glazed to allow viewing of the aquatic habitat from the side as though viewing from underwater. Aquaria are further subcategorized by temperature (cold water, tropical) and salinity (freshwater, brackish, marine).

A Dutch aquarium (origin = Netherlands) is an underwater garden that features plants, with minimal visible hardscaping and few fish. It is terraced or the back-wall is lined in moss to prevent view through the rear of the aquarium.

=== Terrarium ===
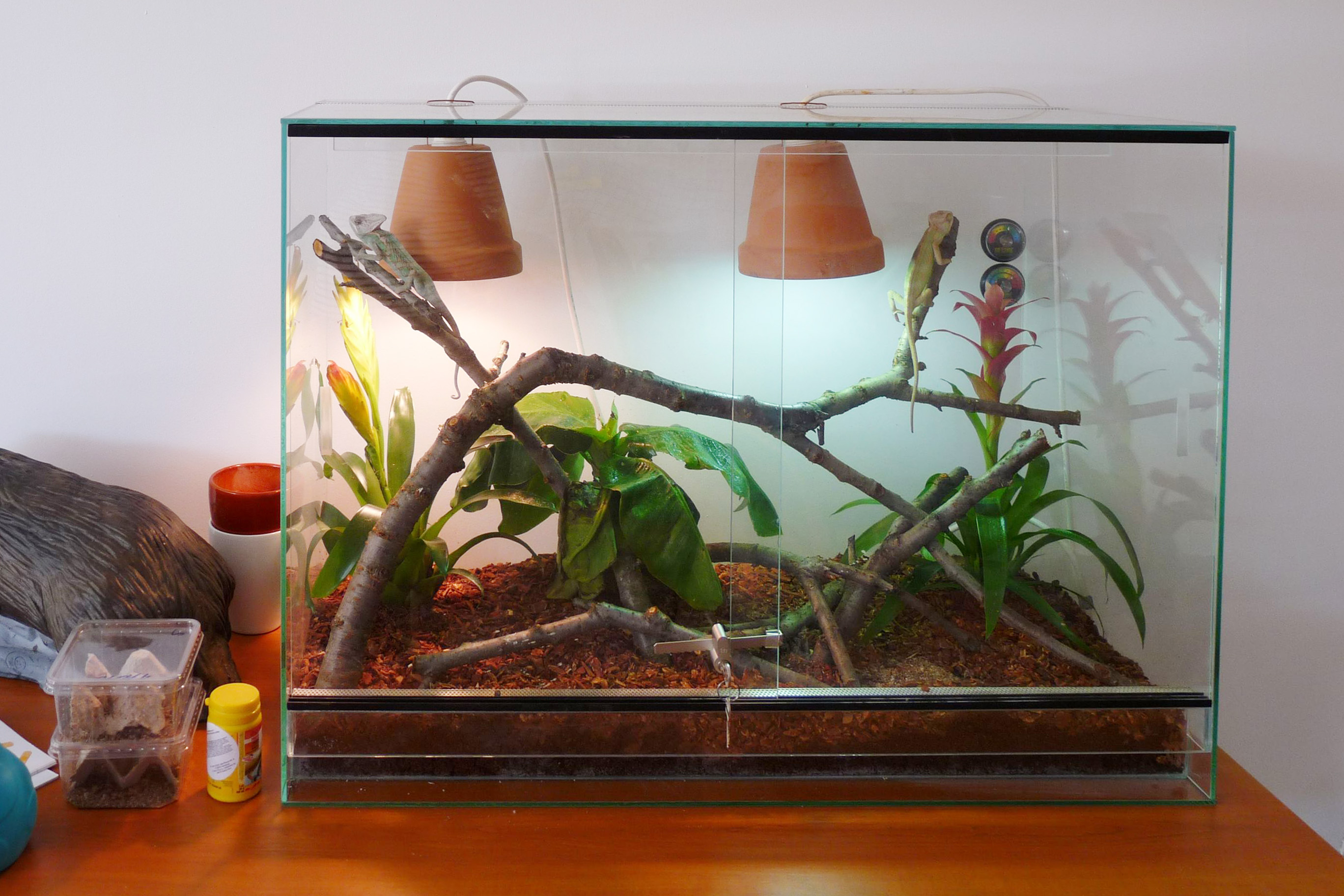
Young chameleon in a terrarium

A terrarium (terra = land) is an enclosure for a land habitat for animals, plants, fungi, lichens or any combination thereof. A bioactive terrarium would additionally house soil microorganisms and janitor animal species such as springtails and terrestrial isopods. It is distinct from a pot plant or animal cage by being enclosed to an extent to permit maintenance of temperature and humidity levels different from the ambient environment. Terraria are further subcategorized by biome (tropical/temperate desert, rainforest, grassland, etc.). A terrarium may feature a horizontal land surface, an escarpment (steep slope or cliff), or a fossorial (underground) section.

A Wardian case is a 19th-century sealed terrarium used for transport or display of plants or small animals such as moths under conditions where ventilation was more harmful than beneficial such as where ambient conditions were too saline, dry or polluted to support delicate species.

A bottle garden is a small sealed glazed terrarium, an actual glass bottle or otherwise, in which all water and nutrients that will be required for future growth of the plant(s) and soil microorganisms are sealed into the vessel at the time of planting, the only required care being management of light and temperature.

A sandwich-style terrarium is a terrarium or a section of a terrarium where soil, other firm substrate or a tree cookie (cross-section or disc) is enclosed in a narrow space between two sheets of glass or two nested jars, for observation of fossorial or woodboring animals such as earthworms, ants or termites.

A glirarium (glires = dormice; plural of glis) is an enclosure for housing trapped edible dormice as they fatten in preparation for hibernation.

=== Semi-aquatic vivarium ===
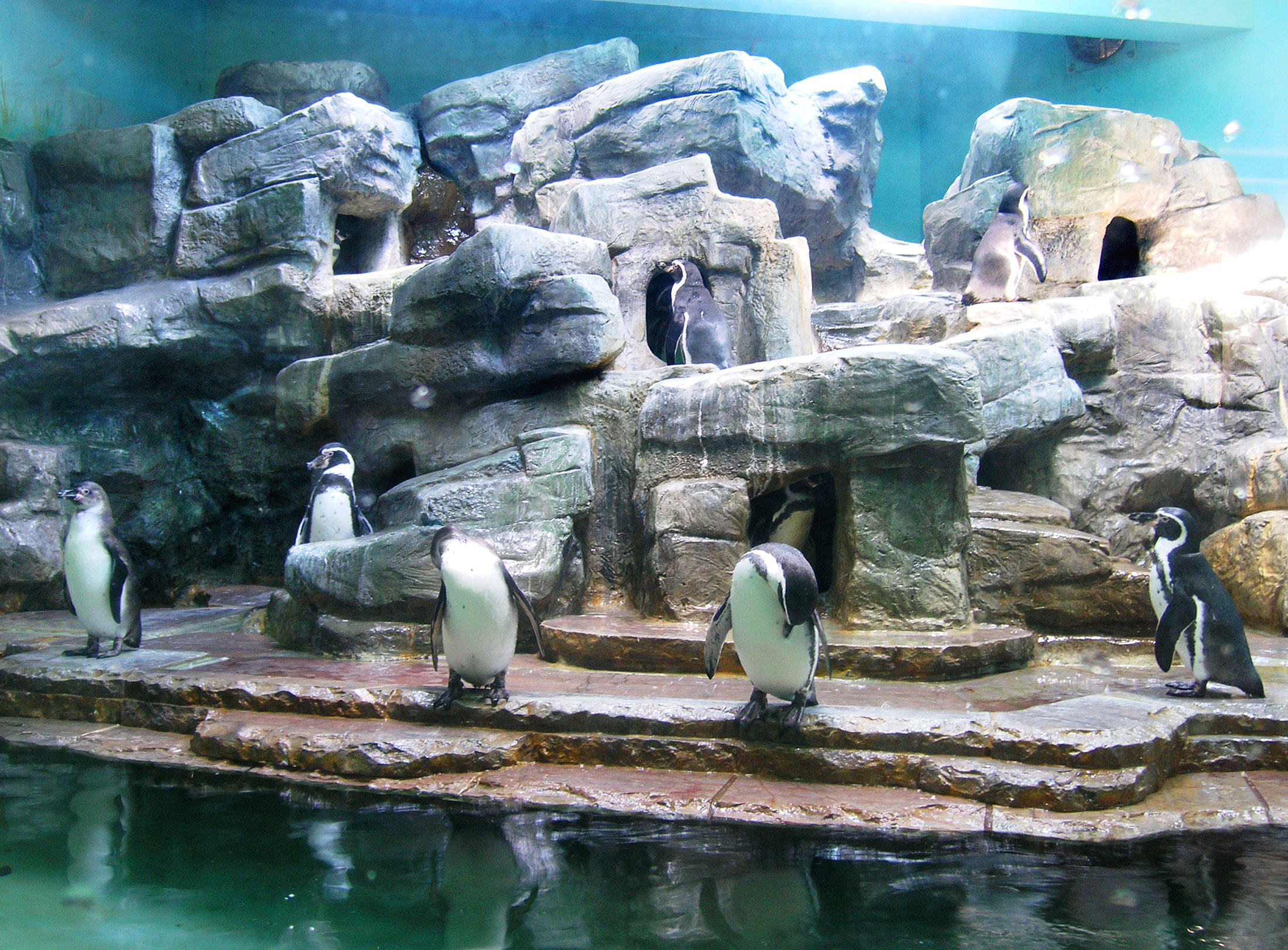
Penguinarium containing Humboldt penguins in Prague Zoo.

A semi-aquatic vivarium is an enclosure for species that live partially submerged or alternate between immersion in water and air. Examples include:

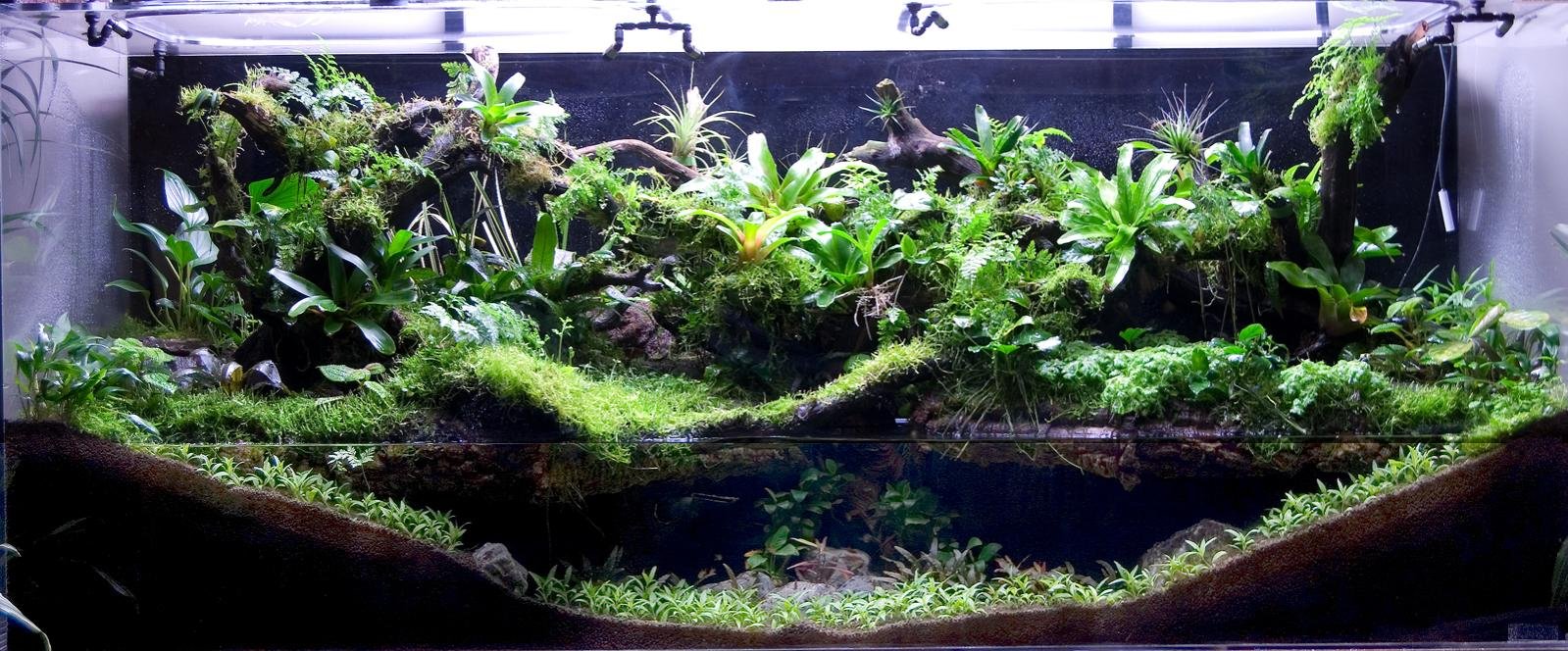
Plants in a paludarium

A paludarium (palus = marsh or swamp) is a semi-aquatic enclosure with aerial space above and water below, designed to house semi-aquatic plants that are rooted underwater but whose crowns reach above the surface of the water, or animals that do the same such as the mata mata. In addition to semi-aquatic plants, a paludarium may house animals such as shallow-water fish and treefrogs. The land area of a paludarium is absent or insignificant, but the term paludarium is often misused to refer to a riparium.

A riparium (ripa = bank or shore) is a semi-aquatic enclosure with a land area beside a water area. Though often used for semi-aquatic animals such as newts or turtles that alternate between time in the water and on land, a riparium can simply be an aquarium-terrarium combination set together for visual effect or to use the water area as means to help increase the humidity for terrestrial species.

An oceanarium is a semi-aquatic marine (saltwater) habitat, with aerial space above the water for animals such as dolphins which emerge wholly or partially above the ocean surface, and/or a land area beside the water to accommodate semi-aquatic species such as seals or penguins that emerge from the water to rest on land. An oceanarium can also house fully aquatic marine animals such as sharks and rays where the aerial space above the tank is designed only to accommodate the observer. A dolphinarium is an oceanarium for dolphins, a penguinarium is an oceanarium for penguins.

=== Pond ===
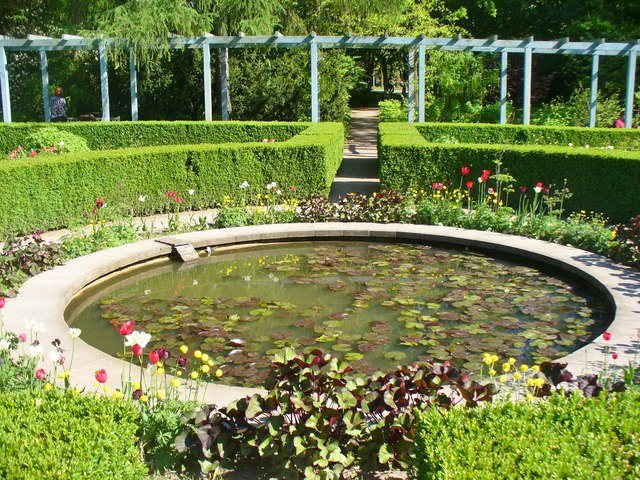
A pond at the Gärten der Welt in Berlin

A natural, excavated or elevated pond is a vivarium if it is sealed from other waterbodies and managed such as by filtration, aeration or additions of animals or plants.

A water garden is an ornamental pond and its shore that features plants growing in and around the water, but may also house animals such as goldfish, turtles or mandarin ducks.

A fish pond is a controlled pond, artificial lake, or reservoir that is stocked with fish.

A koi pond is a pond used for keeping American koi or Japanese nishikigoi.

=== Aviary ===
An aviary (avis = bird) is a large enclosure for birds or other flying, gliding or swinging arboreal animals such as butterflies, bats, flying squirrels or primates. An aviary accommodates the birds' in-flight turning radius, whereas a flight cage restricts the bird to linear flight. Planted aviaries often have a very high ratio of plants to birds as many bird species will completely defoliate sparse plantings.

=== Other ===
A nocturnal house (nocturnus = night (adj.)) is a windowless building or room for housing nocturnal or crepuscular animals, or nyctinastic plants. Artificial lighting is staggered to the local natural daylight so that the inhabitants experience a natural 24-hour cycle, but their activity is scheduled at a time that is convenient for observers.

A greenhouse is an enclosure for plants with a glazed roof and wall(s) that allow the plants to make use of natural sunlight.

A conservatory is a room of a house or of another building, with a glazed roof and wall(s) that combines growing space for plants with a sitting room or dining area for people. Some conservatories also house animals such as koi, tortoises or free-flying birds.

An arboretum (arbor = tree) is a greenhouse, conservatory or outdoor place where many varieties of trees or shrubs are grown.

A desertarium is an enclosure for housing plants and animals native to arid and low-humidity environments like with cacti, succulents, and specific reptiles.

Some animal vivaria are not well-described by their name as related animal species can require vastly different habitats:

- A herpetarium (herpeton = reptile, creeping thing) is an enclosure housing amphibians or reptiles. A serpentarium is a herpetarium for snakes.
- An insectarium is an enclosure for housing insects. When used to refer to a facility, it often refers to a facility that houses both insects and other invertebrates. A formicarium (formica = ant) or ant farm is an enclosure housing ants.

== Size and materials ==
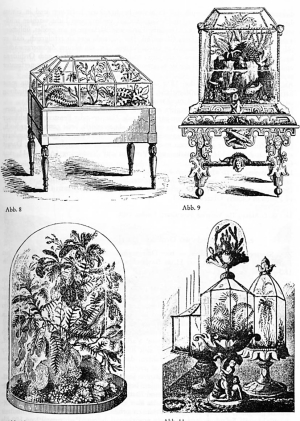
Nathaniel Bagshaw Ward first introduced Terrarium and Vivarium in 1842, built mainly from glass and wood.

A vivarium is usually made from clear container (often plastic or glass). Unless it is an aquarium, it does not need to withstand the pressure of water, so it can also be made out of wood or metal, with at least one transparent side. Modern vivariums can be as simple as a bottle (see bottle garden) and are sometimes constructed from epoxy-coated plywood and fitted with sliding glass doors. Coating the inside of a plywood vivarium helps to retain the natural effect of the environment. Epoxy-coated plywood vivariums retain heat better than glass or plastic enclosures and are able to withstand high degrees of humidity. They may be cubical, spherical, cuboidal, or other shapes. The choice of materials depends on the desired size and weight of the entire ensemble, resistance to high humidity, the cost and the desired quality.

The floor of a vivarium must have sufficient surface area for the species living inside. The height can also be important for the larger plants, climbing plants, or for tree climbing animal species. The width must be great enough to create the sensation of depth, both for the pleasure of the spectator and the good of the species inside.

The most commonly used substrates are common soil, small pebbles, sand, peat, chips of various trees, wood mulch, vegetable fibres (of coconut, for example), or a combination of these. The choice of the substrate depends on the needs of the plants or of the animals, moisture, the risks involved and aesthetic aspects. Sterile vivariums, sometimes used to ensure high levels of hygiene (especially during quarantine periods), generally have very straightforward, easily removable substrates such as paper tissue, wood chips and even newspaper. Typically, a low-nutrient, high-drainage substrate is placed on top of a false bottom or layer of expanded clay aggregate or stones, which retains humidity without saturating the substrate surface.

== Environmental controls ==
=== Lighting ===
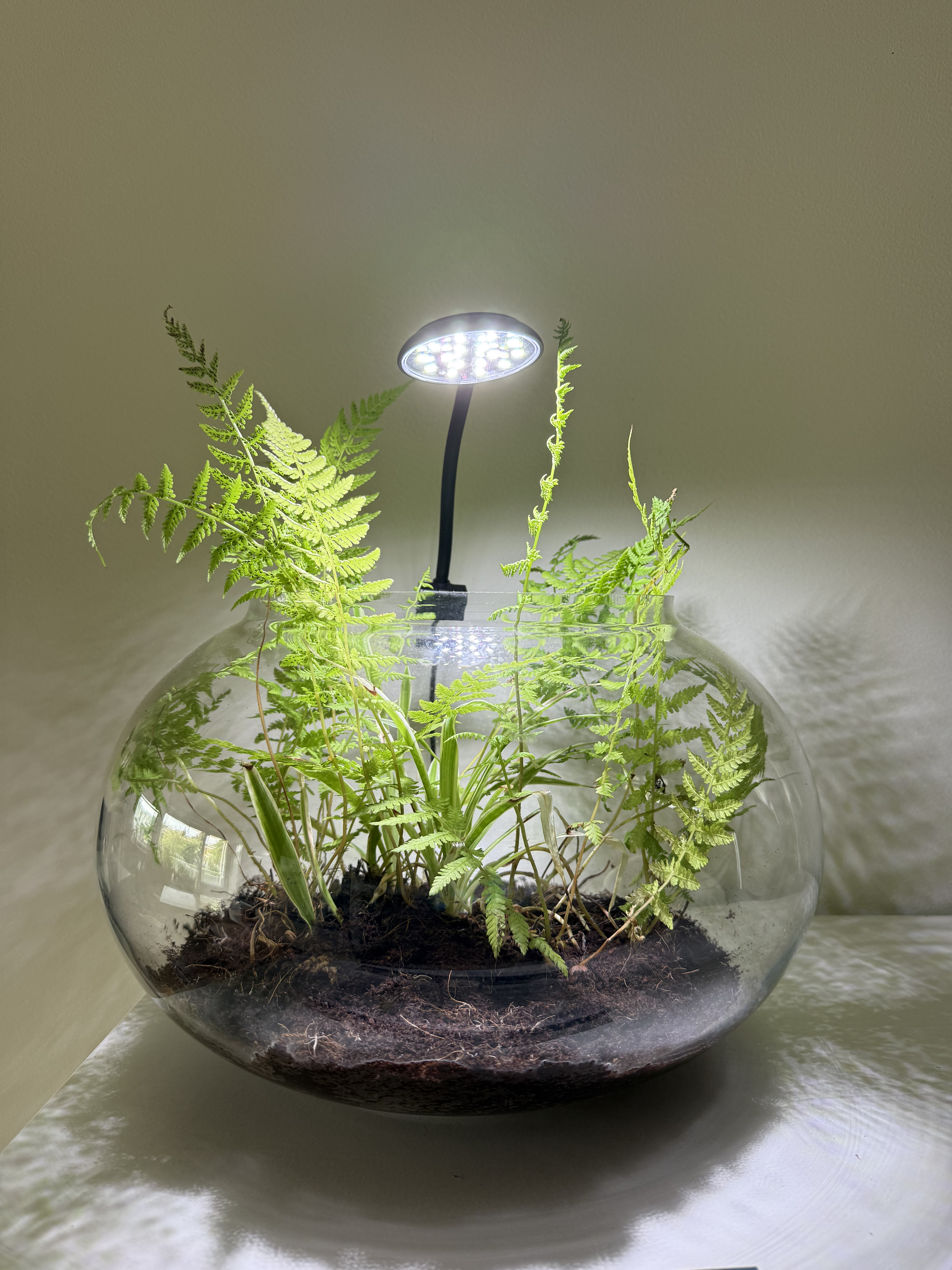
Terrarium with a light source

A lighting system is necessary, always adapted to the requirements of the animal and plant species. For example, certain reptiles in their natural environment need to heat themselves by the sun, so various bulbs may be necessary to simulate this in a terrarium.

Also, certain plants or diurnal animals need a source of UV to help synthesize Vitamin D and assimilate calcium. Such UV can be provided by specialized fluorescent tubes or daylight bulbs, which recreate the reptiles' natural environment and emit a more natural sunlight effect compared to the blue glow of a fluorescent tube.

A day/night regulator might be needed to simulate with accuracy the alternation of light and dark periods. The duration of the simulated day and night depends on the conditions in the natural habitat of the species and the season desired.

=== Temperature ===
The temperature can be a very important parameter for species that cannot adapt to other conditions than those found in their natural habitat.

Heating can be provided by several means, all of which are usually controlled by a thermostat: heating lamps or infrared lamps, hot plates and heat mats, providing heat at the base or sides of a terrarium, heating cords or heat mats placed beneath the substrate, heat rocks, or more complex equipment generating or producing hot air to the inside of the vivarium.

Similar to lighting, a decrease in temperature might be needed for the simulated night periods, thus keeping living species healthy. Such variation need to be coherent to those found in the natural habitats of the species. Thermo-control systems are often used to regulate light cycles and heating, as well as humidity (coupled to built-in misting or rain systems). Light-dependent resistors or photo-diodes connected to the lighting are frequently used to simulate daytime, evening and nighttime light cycles, as well as timers to switch lighting and heating on and off when necessary.

=== Humidity ===
Many plants and animals have quite limited tolerance to the variation of moisture.

The regulation of humidity can be done by several means: regular water pulverization, water evaporation inside (from a basin, or circulation of water), or automated pulverization systems and humidifiers.

=== Ventilation and openings ===
Access inside the vivarium is required for the purpose of maintenance, to take care of the plants and animals, or for the addition and withdrawal of food. In the case of some animals, a frontal opening is preferable because accessing a vivarium from the top is associated by some species with the presence of predators and can therefore cause unnecessary stress.

Ventilation is not just important for circulating air, but also for preventing the growth of mold and development and spread of harmful bacteria. This is especially important in warm, humid vivariums. The traditional method consists of placing a suction fan (or ventilation slits) at a low level and another exhaust fan at a higher level, which allows the continual circulation of fresh air.

== Gallery ==
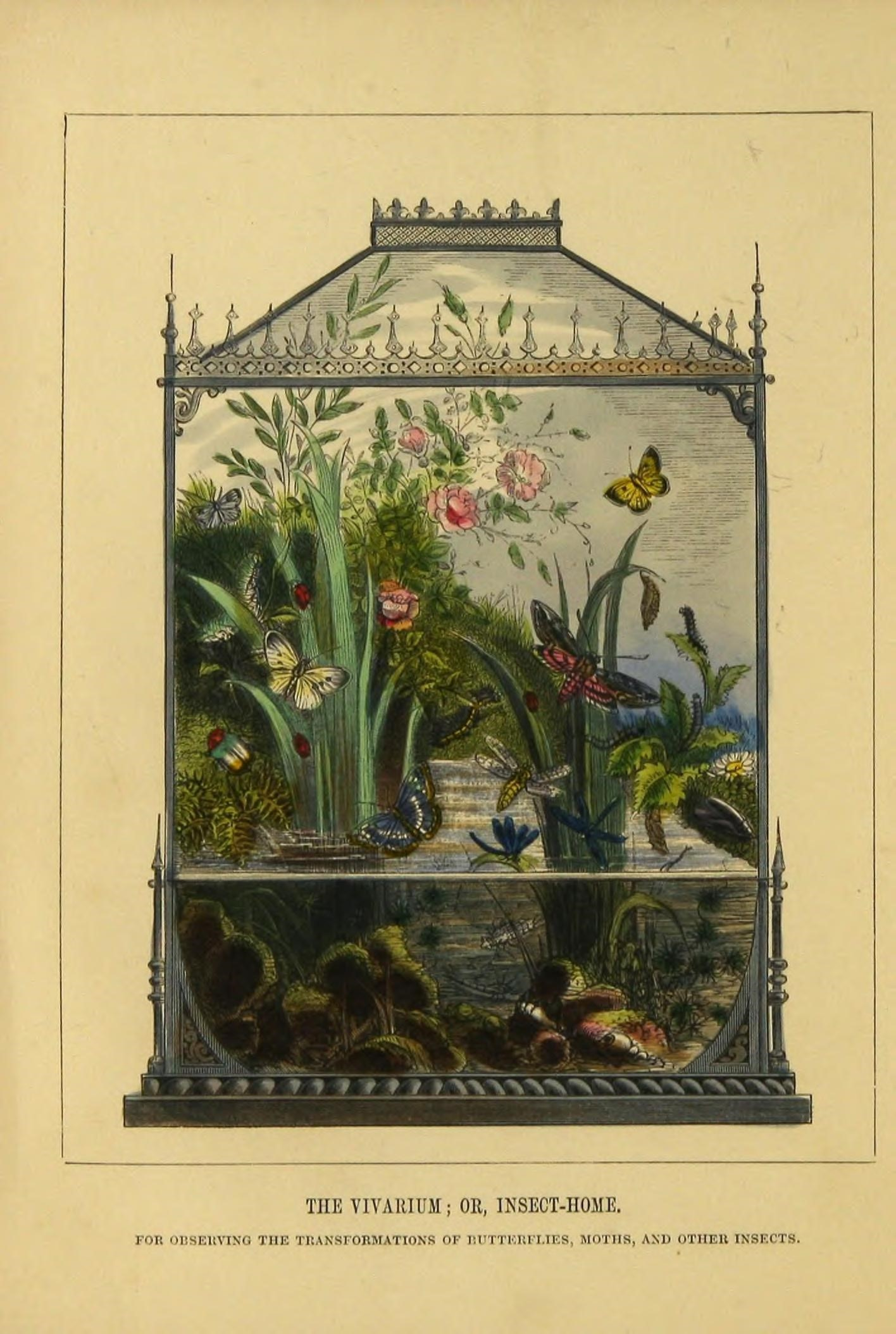
Butterfly vivarium or Insect home, Henry Noel, ca. 1858.

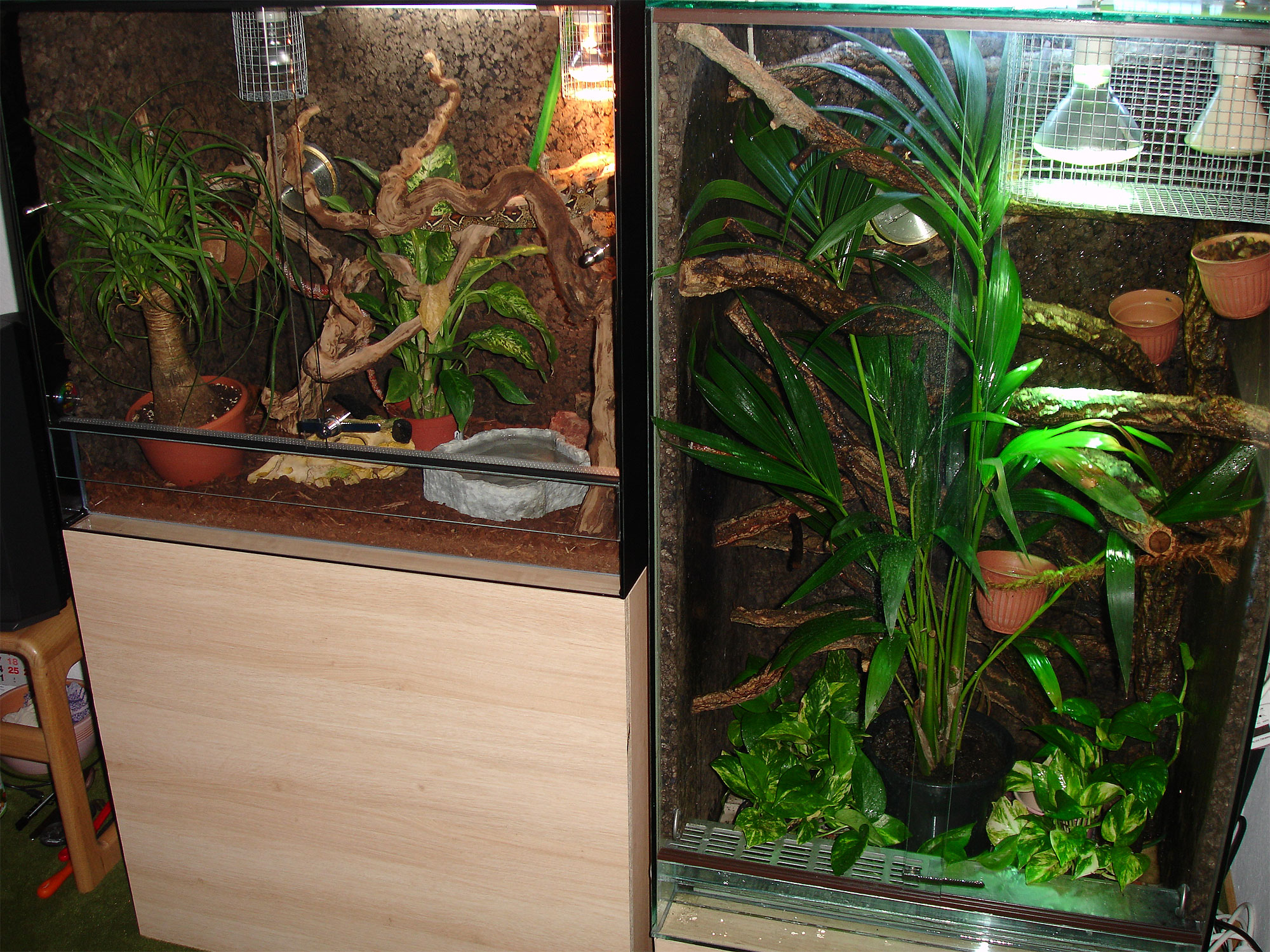
Two large glass terrariums with plants

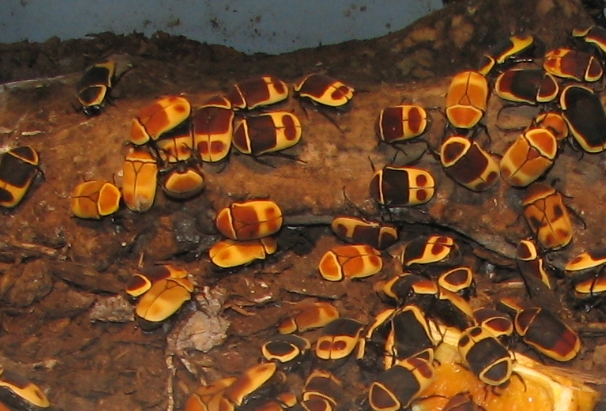
Taxicab or sun beetles in an insectarium.

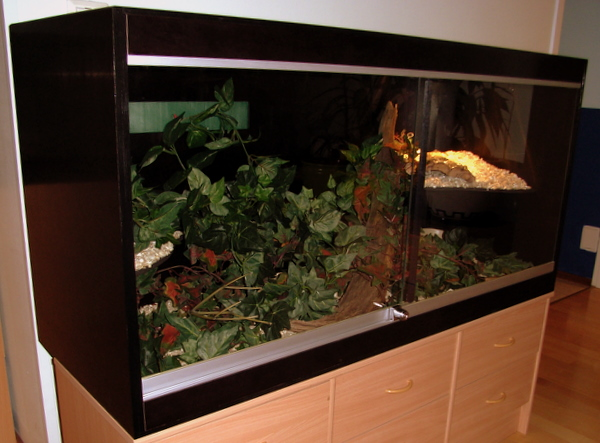
Vivarium with epoxy-coated plywood walls.

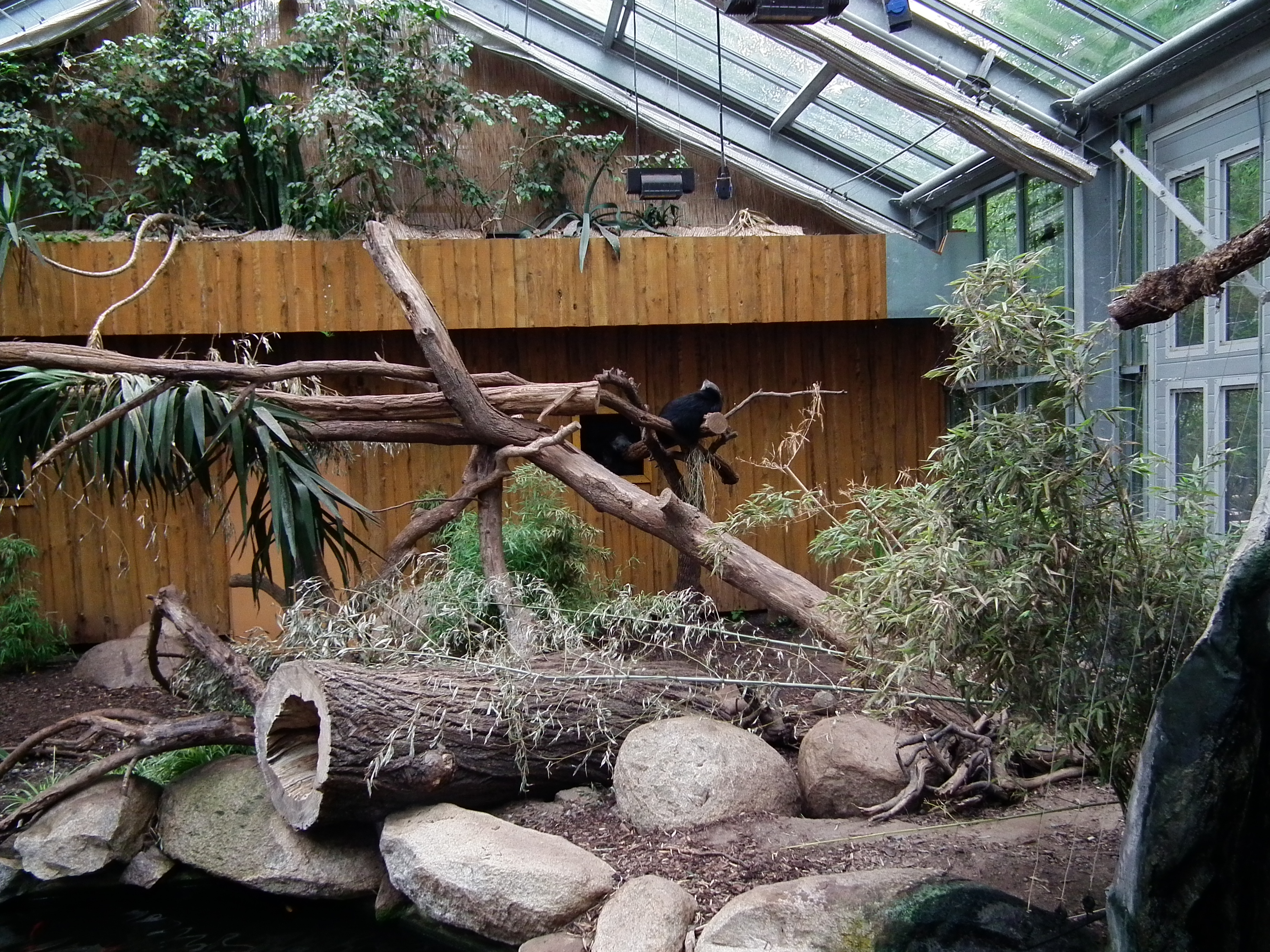
Binturong (Arctictis binturong) in vivarium Darmstadt, Hessen, Germany.

== See also ==
- Aquascaping
- Biome
- Biosphere
- Closed ecological system
- Ecosphere
- Ecosystem
- Wardian case
- Winogradsky column
- Ex situ conservation
- Botanical garden
- Barn
- Stable
- Greenhouse
