= Penguinarium =

Enclosed area for penguins

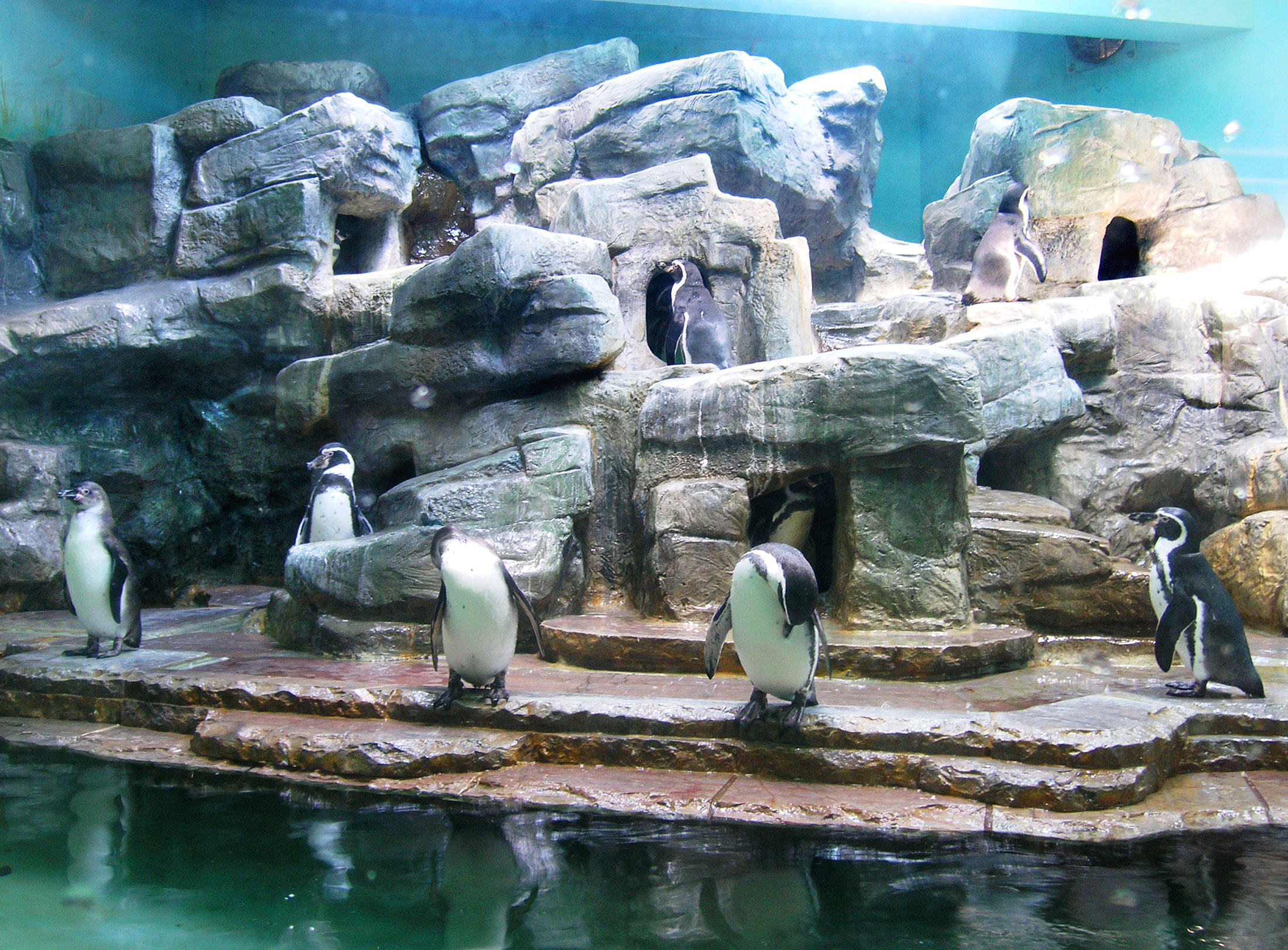
Penguinarium containing Humboldt penguins in Prague Zoo

A penguinarium is a vivarium for penguins intended to simulate aspects of their natural environment.

Penguinariums date back at least to 1968, when the Detroit Zoo opened the first in North America and possibly the world. The Detroit penguinarium was expanded in 2015 with a US$21 million overhaul funded in part by a US$10 million donation, the largest in the zoo's history, from a single donor. In April 2016, the Polk Penguin Conservation Center opened at the Detroit Zoo becoming the world's largest penguinarium. However, the exhibit temporarily closed in 2019 for waterproofing repairs as the penguins were moved back into the 1968 exhibit. The conservation center reopened on February 14, 2022.

As of 2005, the world's second largest penguinarium was located on the Spanish island of Tenerife, where twelve tons of artificial snow were generated daily for the penguins at Loro Parque aquarium.
