= Veracruz Reef System National Park =

National park in Mexico

- Sistema Arrecifal Veracruzano National Marine Park Sistema Arrecifal Veracruzano Core Zone
- IUCN category II (national park)
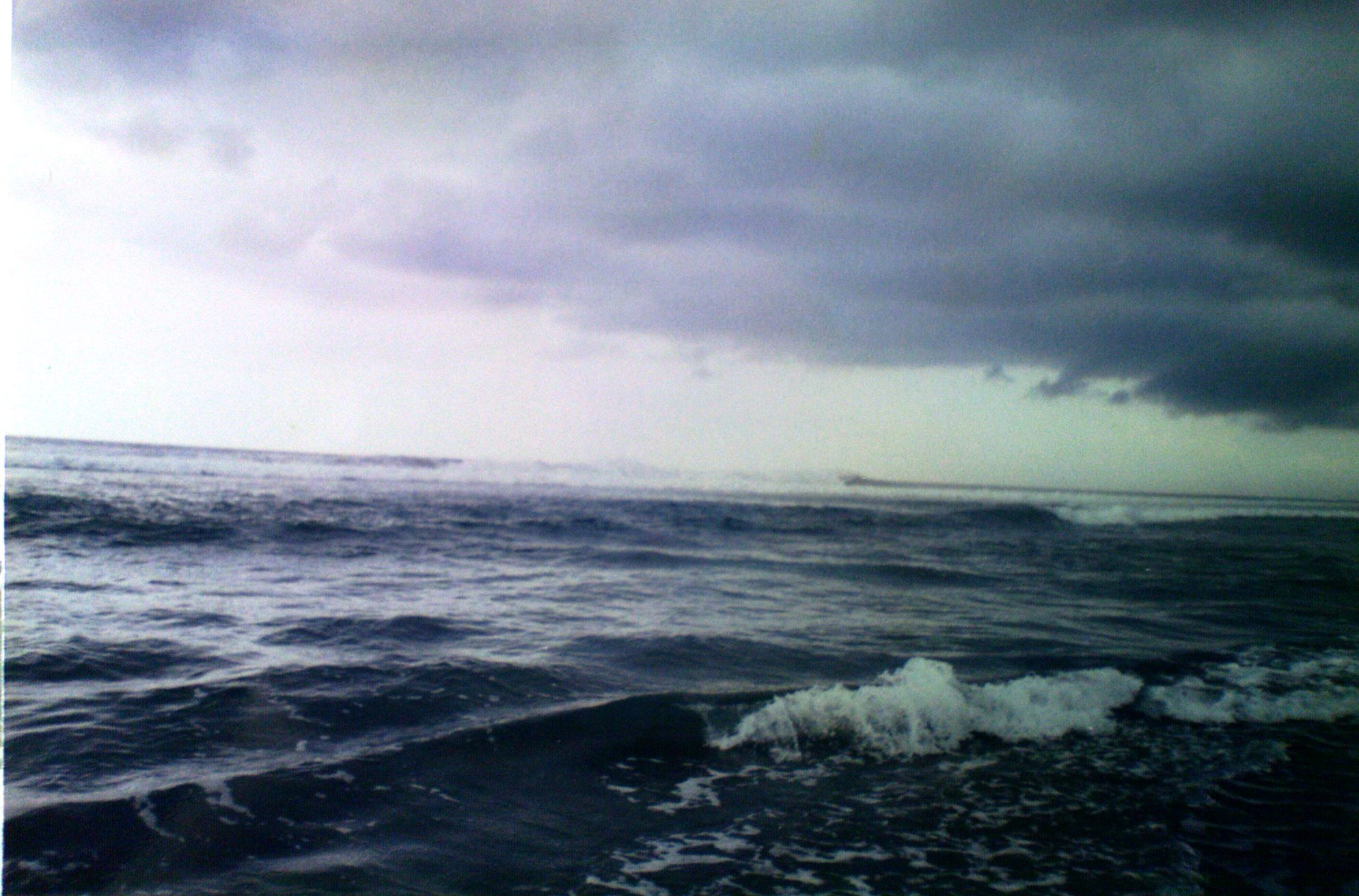
- Coast line of Veracruz Reef System

- Location within Veracruz Location within Mexico
- Interactive map of Veracruz Reef System National Park
- Location: Veracruz, Mexico
- Coordinates: 19.18°N 95.79°W
- Area: 11.14 km^{2} (4.30 sq mi)
- Established: 2012
- Governing body: National Commission of Natural Protected Areas

Ramsar Wetland
- Official name: Parque Nacional Sistema Arrecifal Veracruzano
- Designated: 2 February 2004
- Reference no.: 1346

Veracruz Reef System National Park (Spanish: Sistema Arrecifal Veracruzano National Marine Park) is a national marine park and protected area located in Veracruz, Mexico. The park was established in 1994 and covers a total area of approximately 65,516.47 hectares (161,894.7 acres), divided into two polygons: the Veracruz Polygon, which comprises seven reefs and two islands, and the Antón Lizardo Polygon, with 12 reefs and four islands.

== Reef groups ==
The reef system is divided into four reef groups:

- Outer reefs: continued development on windward and leeward slopes.
- Intermediate reefs: have a long, very gentle leeward slope.
- Inner reefs: have a large amount of sediment accumulated on the leeward slope.
- Fringing reefs: they develop on the coast, presenting a development that does not exceed 12 m depth on the windward side.

The ecological importance of the Reef Park is such that the system is also designated as one of Mexico's Ramsar Sites - Wetland Sites of International Importance, with four of the eight biodiversity criteria established by the Ramsar Convention. Among the established criteria, number one considers the wetland as a rare or unique example, because the reef system has been subjected to great anthropogenic pressure during the last 500 years. Despite the damage done to the reef, there are studies that indicate that it has a higher recovery rate compared to other reefs in the Gulf of Mexico.

Currently, the deterioration of the environmental condition has increased due to drainage discharges from the metropolitan area, as well as hydrocarbon spills due to the movement of vessels in the port area. (Ramsar Wetlands Information Sheet, 2004- CONANP).

== Gallery ==
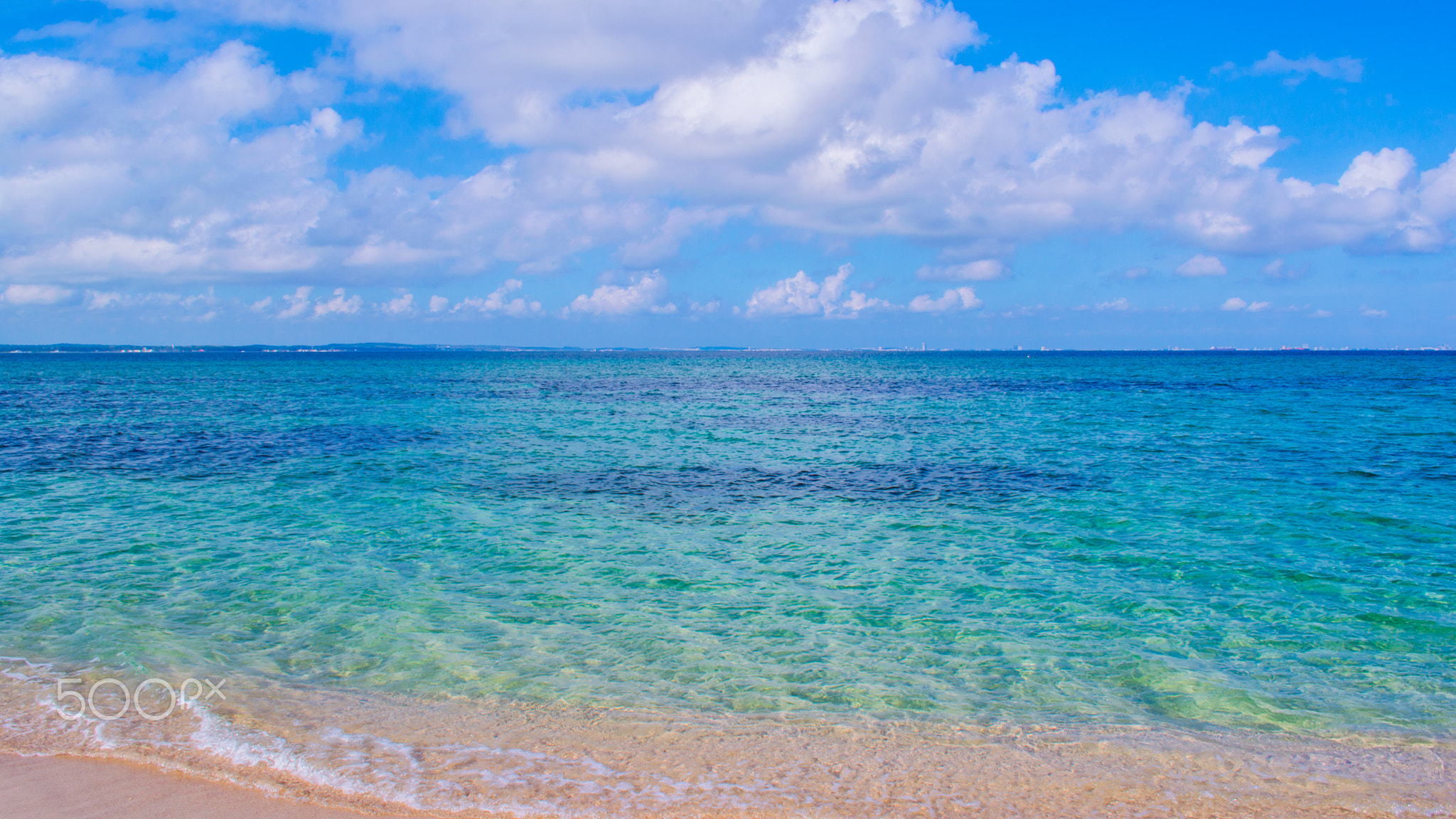
View from Enmedio Island

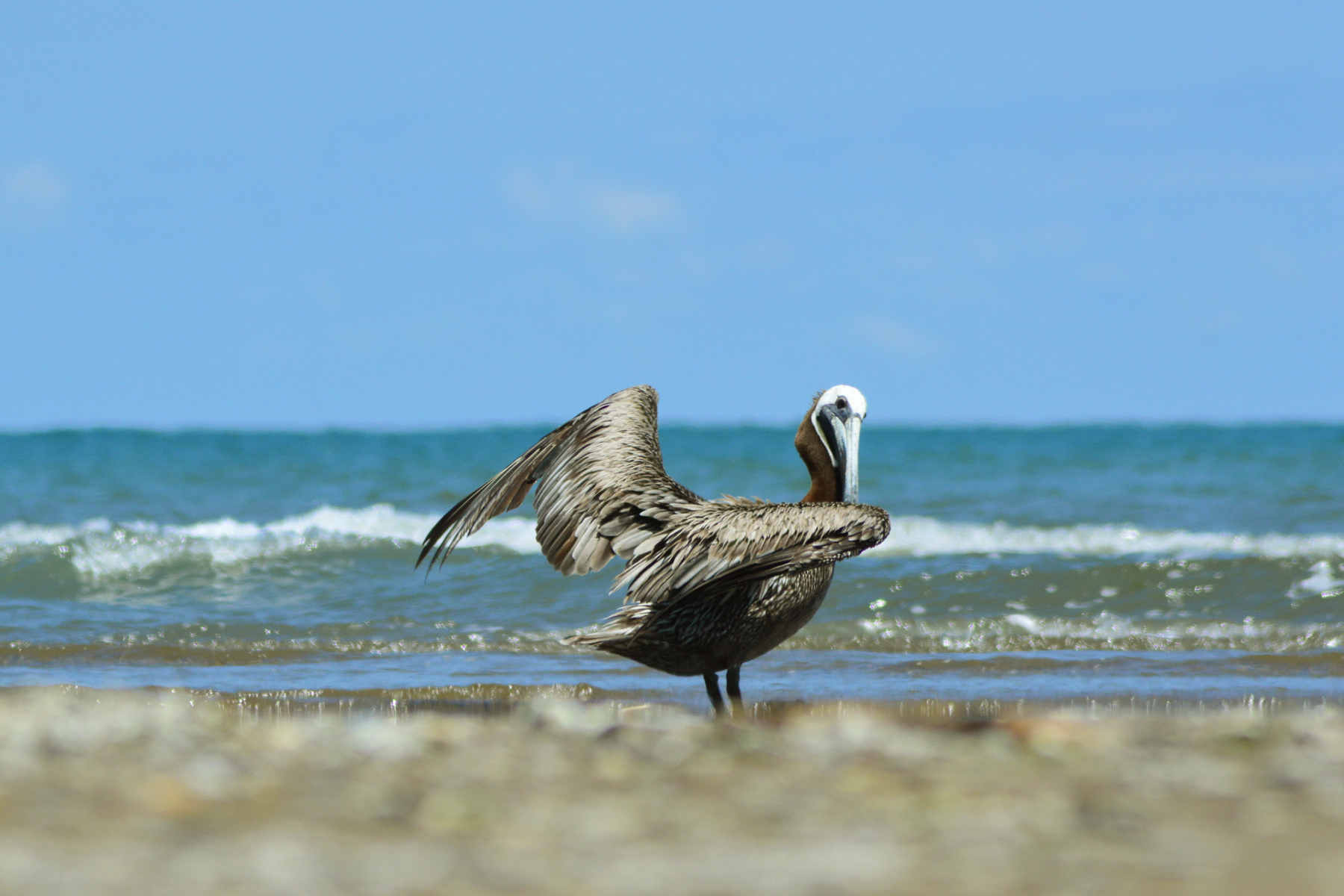
Brown pelican

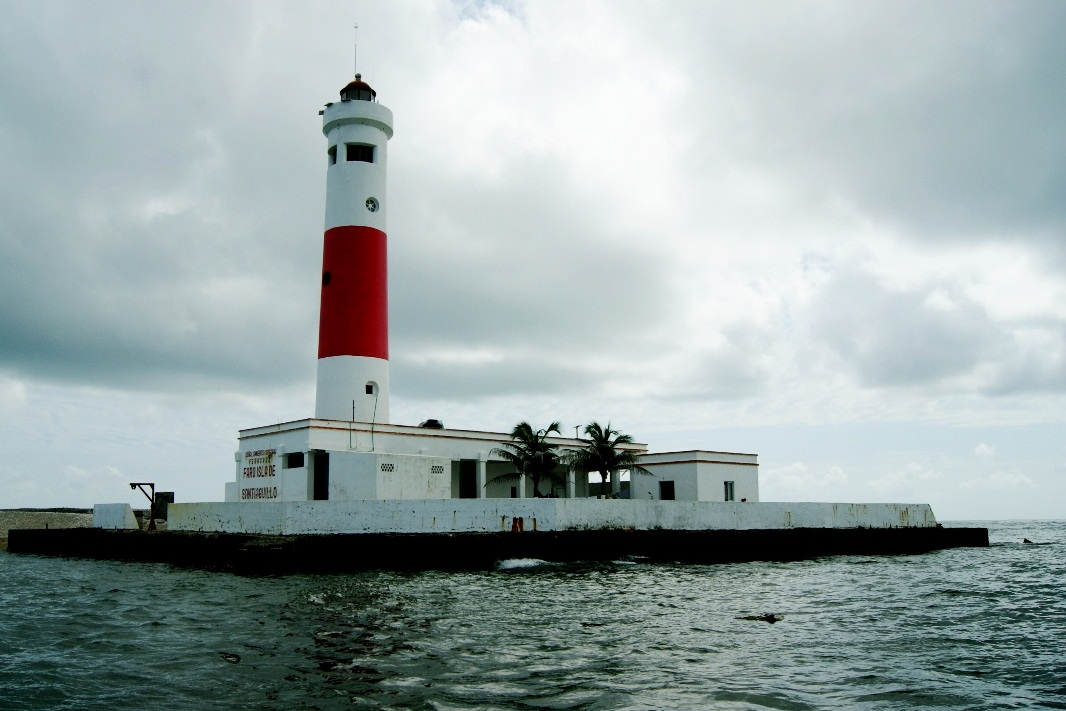
Lighthouse in Santiaguillo Island

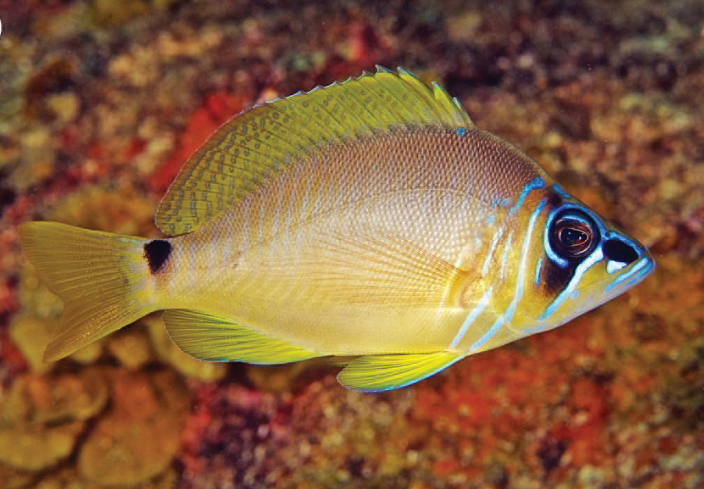
Mero blanco veracruzano
