= Bottle garden =

Plants grown in a limited glass container

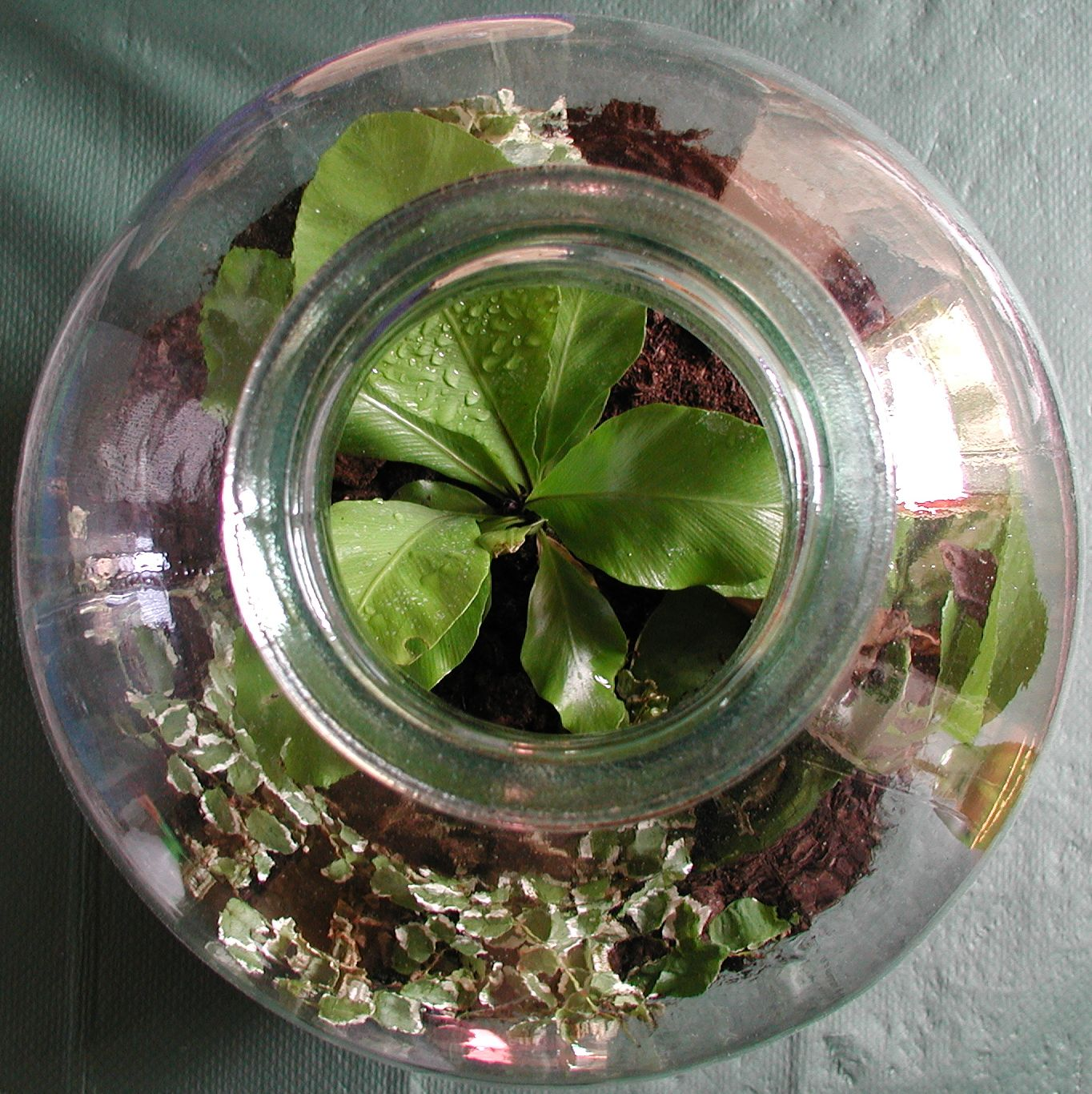
Opened bottle garden seen from above

A bottle garden is a type of closed terrarium in which plants are grown. They usually consist of a glass bottle or carboy with a narrow neck and a small opening. Plants are grown inside the bottle with little or no exposure to the outside environment and can be contained indefinitely inside the bottle if properly illuminated.

== Uses ==
Bottle gardens are commonly used as a form of decoration, or as a substitute garden in areas with little space, such as patios or high rise apartments. Being easy to create and maintain, bottle gardens are also used in schools as an economical way to study miniature eco-systems within the confines of a classroom. They can also be used as a control mechanism, enabling the internal environment of the bottle to be effectively controlled and isolated from outside stimuli. Bottle gardens have also been used for vegetable production in dryland areas and areas with a shortage of water, allowing water to be conserved for other uses.

== Operation ==
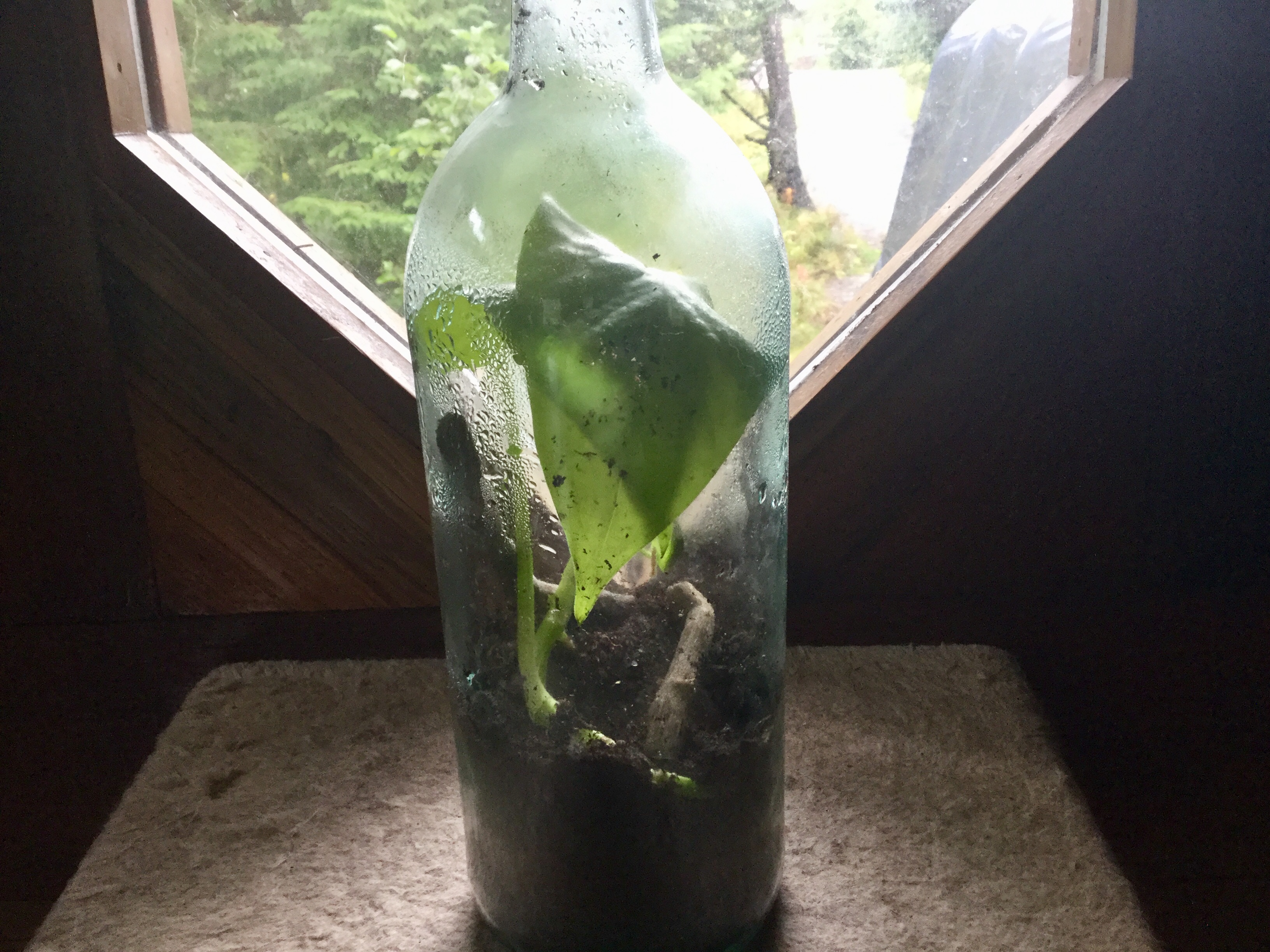
This bottle with a lime pothos (Epipremnum aureum) has not been opened or watered since the plant was placed in it several months previously.

A bottle garden has the essential requirements of soil, water, and light for the survival of plants and other organisms that are housed in it, as well as a reservoir of water, as water is trapped inside the bottle and unable to evaporate. The carbon dioxide in the trapped air is used for photosynthesis, and the oxygen produced from photosynthesis is used for respiration and expelled. Aerobic organisms like shrimp, snails, or bacteria take this excess oxygen for their own respiration, and return carbon dioxide to the air. As such they require almost no maintenance.

== Oldest example ==
The oldest bottle garden in existence is alleged to have been planted in 1960, and to have remained sealed from 1972 until at least 2013. It is widely believed to belong to David Latimer, a retired engineer from England, who planted a Tradescantia in a sealed glass bottle as an experiment. Apart from watering it once in 1972, the bottle has remained closed, functioning as a self-sustaining ecosystem for over six decades.

== See also ==
- Mesocosm
- Biosphere
- Closed ecological system
- Wardian case
- Biotope
