= Nathaniel Bagshaw Ward =

English doctor

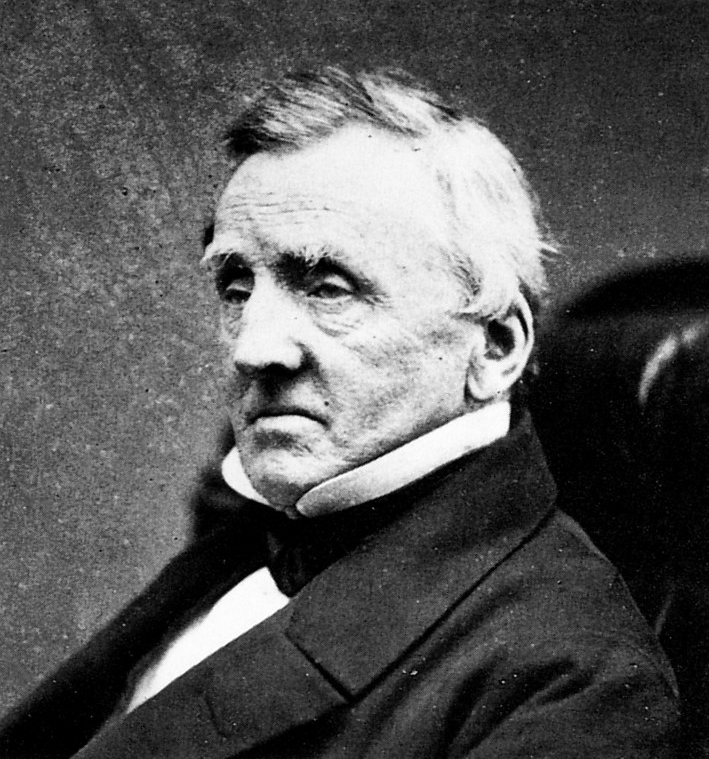
- Born: 1791
- Died: 4 June 1868 (aged 76–77); St Leonard's, Sussex
- Occupation: Doctor
- Known for: "Inventing" and popularizing glass plant-cases (he and others independently developed them)

Nathaniel Bagshaw Ward (1791 – 4 June 1868 in St Leonard's, Sussex) was an English medical doctor who popularised a case for growing and transporting plants which was called the Wardian case.

== Biography ==
Ward was born in London, the son of Stephen Smith Ward, a medical doctor. Little is known of his early years and family life, but he is believed to have been sent to Jamaica at the age of thirteen where he may have taken an interest in plants. He practised medicine in a poor area of the East End of London and took an interest in botany and entomology in spare time or when on vacation in Cobham, Kent. Tyler-Whittle in his book, The Plant Hunters, describes the area where he lived:

What is known is that Wellclose Square, that part of dockland where he lived, was a Sherlock Holmes sort of place; not exactly producing lepers, abominable lascars and wicked Chinamen, but giving that impression all the same. And had Holmes and Watson been acquainted with their contemporary, Dr. Nathaniel Ward, undoubtedly they would have admired his scientific method of observing and deducing.

Ward qualified as a member of the Royal College of Surgeons in London in 1814, then later became a fellow of the Linnean Society in 1852.

His four sons, Stephen (born 1819), Nathaniel (born 1821), John (born 1824) and Richard (born 1831) all went on to qualify as doctors and surgeons. Stephen and Nathaniel after qualifying both worked as assistants with their father at the family East End practice. John joined the Royal Navy in 1846 as an assistant surgeon, serving with distinction on HMS Vengeance during the Crimean War, with the youngest son Richard having his own practice in Central London.

== Ward and the Wardian case ==
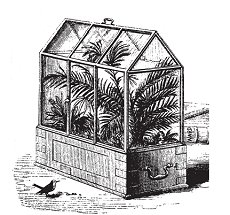
The Wardian case

Ward first noticed the effects of a hermetically sealed glass container in 1829. He had placed a chrysalis of a sphinx moth in damp soil at the bottom of a bottle and covered it with a lid. A week later he noticed that a fern and grass seedling had sprouted from the soil. His interest piqued, he saw that evaporated moisture condensed on the walls of the bottle during the day, and ran back down into the soil towards evening, maintaining a constant humidity.

The glass case that he used to rear butterflies and grow plants was used widely during the time for introducing plants into the British colonies. His first experiments with plants inside glass cases started in 1830. In 1833 George Loddiges used Wardian cases for shipping plants from Australia and said that "whereas I used formerly to lose nineteen out of the twenty of the plants I imported during the voyage, nineteen out of the twenty is now the average of those that survive". Loddiges was the vice-president of the Horticultural Society and Wardian cases became popular.

Scottish lawyer and amateur botanist named Allan A. Maconochie had created a similar terrarium almost a decade earlier, but his failure to publish meant that Ward received credit as the sole inventor.

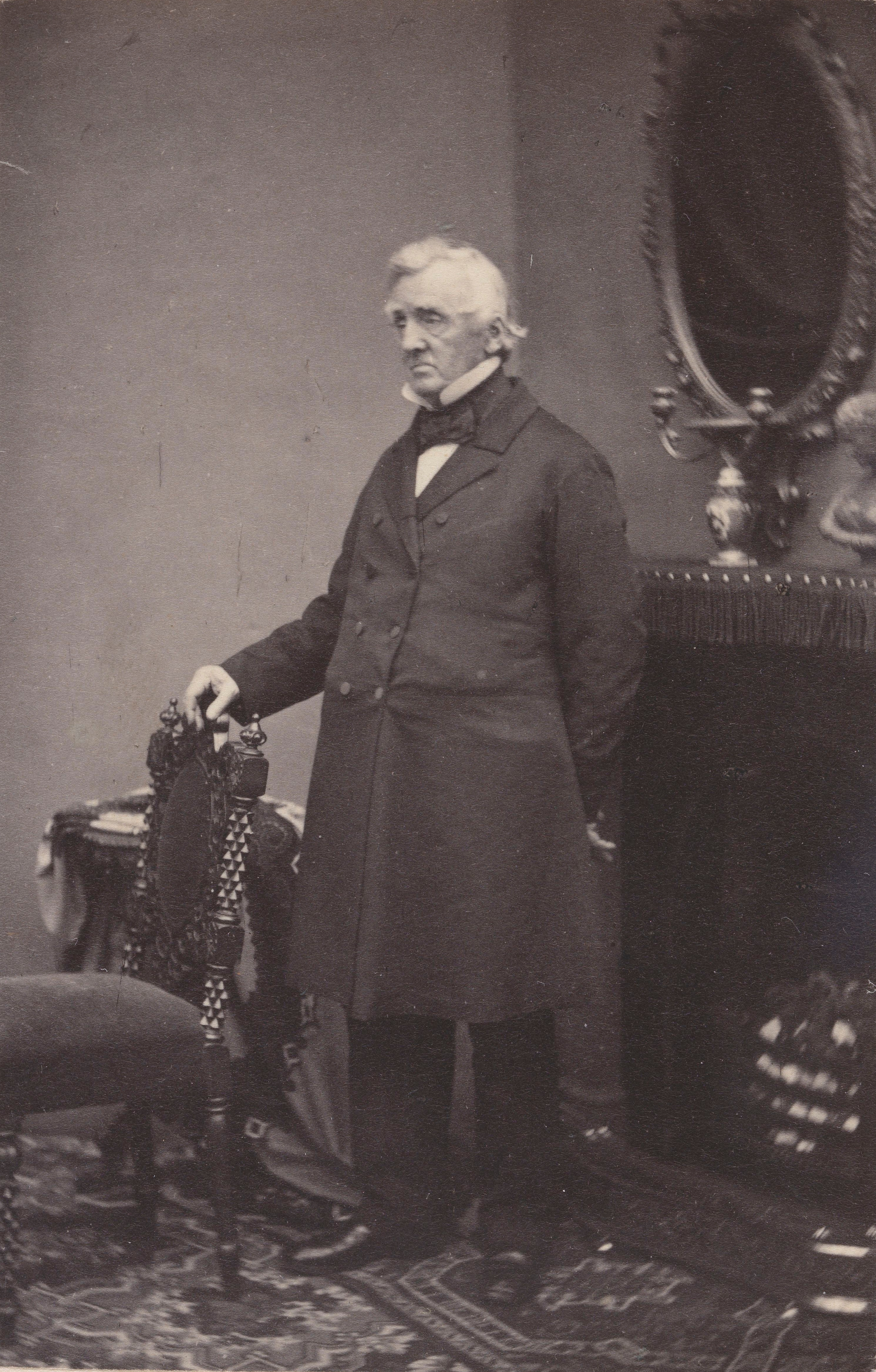
Ward in 1866

He attempted to make a greenhouse at the Clapham garden on the principle of the Wardian case. This was however criticised by John Lindley in the Gardeners' Chronicle, who wrote that "when it is opened and shut from day to day, it has no more right to the name [of Wardian case] than a common greenhouse". Lindley also wrote saying that Ward had an inordinate vanity and a desire to be "recognised [as] a second Newton".

Dr Ward delivered a lecture on his discovery of a way to preserve plants in 1854 to the Royal Society at the Chelsea Physic Garden. He also worked on microscopy and helped in the development of the Chelsea Physic Garden as a member of the board. He was elected a fellow of the Royal Society in 1852.

Nathaniel Bagshaw Ward died at St Leonards in Sussex and is buried in an unmarked grave in West Norwood Cemetery.

He was honoured in 1837, when botanists William Henry Harvey and William Jackson Hooker named a species of moss from South Africa after him, Wardia.

== Other sources ==
- Allen, D.E. (1969). The Victorian Fern Craze. London: Hutchinson.
- Allen, D.E. (1976). The Naturalist in Britain - A Social History. London: Allen Lane.
- Desmond, Ray (1979). "The problems of transporting plants". In Harris, J (ed.). In The Garden: a Celebration of One Thousand Years of British Gardening. London. pp. 99–104.
- Hooker, J.D. (1868). "Nathaniel Bagshaw Ward, FRS, FLS". The Gardeners' Chronicle: 655–656.
- Minter, S. (2002). The Apothecaries' Garden: a History of the Chelsea Physic Garden. London: History Press.
