= Xanthoparmelia lavicola =

Conservation status
- Apparently Secure (NatureServe)

Scientific classification
- Kingdom: Fungi
- Division: Ascomycota
- Class: Lecanoromycetes
- Order: Lecanorales
- Family: Parmeliaceae
- Genus: Xanthoparmelia
- Species: X. lavicola

Binomial name
- Xanthoparmelia lavicola (Gyeln.) Hale

Synonyms
- Parmelia lavicola Gyeln.

Species of fungus

Xanthoparmelia lavicola is a species of lichen in the family Parmeliaceae that can be found in Mexico, north to Arizona and California in the United States. It has also been found in Ecuador. Xanthoparmelia lavicola grows in dry habitats on acidic rocks. It has also been called the trochanter lichen.

== Description ==
The upper part is either light yellow or yellow-green, and the bottom surface is brown. The apothecia are 2–7 millimetres (0.079–0.276 in) wide, and the thallus is laminal and 4–7 centimetres (1.6–2.8 in) in diameter. The disc is either cinnamon-brown or dark brown, and ellipsoid. The pycnidia is immersed, while the conidia are bifusiform.

== See also ==
- List of Xanthoparmelia species
