= Xanthoparmelia neowyomingica =

Conservation status
- Critically Imperiled (NatureServe)

Scientific classification
- Kingdom: Fungi
- Division: Ascomycota
- Class: Lecanoromycetes
- Order: Lecanorales
- Family: Parmeliaceae
- Genus: Xanthoparmelia
- Species: X. neowyomingica

Binomial name
- Xanthoparmelia neowyomingica Hale (1989)

Species of lichen found in the USA

Xanthoparmelia neowyomingica is a rock shield lichen which belongs to the Xanthoparmelia genus. It is uncommon, and is listed as endangered by the Nature Conservatory.

== Description ==
This lichen grows on soil. It has firm lobes that are 3–4 cm (1.2–1.6 in) in diameter and yellowish green in color. Lobes are approximately 0.8–2 mm (0.031–0.079 in) wide, and are convoluted and branched at the tips. It has moderately to densely packed pale brown rhizines on the underside that are 0.5–1.0 mm (0.020–0.039 in) long.

== Habitat and range ==
It is found in the North American southwest, including the US states of Montana, Colorado, and Wyoming.

== See also ==
- List of Xanthoparmelia species
