= Xanthoparmelia californica =

Conservation status
- Imperiled (NatureServe)

Scientific classification
- Kingdom: Fungi
- Division: Ascomycota
- Class: Lecanoromycetes
- Order: Lecanorales
- Family: Parmeliaceae
- Genus: Xanthoparmelia
- Species: X. californica

Binomial name
- Xanthoparmelia californica Hale 1984

Species of lichen found in the USA and Mexico

Xanthoparmelia californica is a lichen which belongs to the Xanthoparmelia genus. The lichen is uncommon, and is listed as imperiled by the Nature Conservatory.

== Description ==
This lichen grows to around 3–6 cm in diameter, with irregularly lobate lobes which are approximately 0.8-1.5 mm wide with smooth edges. The upper surface of the lichen is yellow-green to bluish green. It gains darker rings with age, and is light brown on the underside.

== Habitat and range ==
It is found in the North American southwest, including the US states of California, Utah, and Arizona, and the Mexican state of Sonora.

== See also ==
- List of Xanthoparmelia species
