= Xanthoparmelia camtschadalis =

Scientific classification
- Kingdom: Fungi
- Division: Ascomycota
- Class: Lecanoromycetes
- Order: Lecanorales
- Family: Parmeliaceae
- Genus: Xanthoparmelia
- Species: X. camtschadalis

Binomial name
- Xanthoparmelia camtschadalis Hale (1974)

Species of lichen

Xanthoparmelia camtschadalis is a foliose lichen that belongs to the genus Xanthoparmelia. The lichen is also known as the Kamchatka rock-shield lichen. The lichen was formally described as a new species in 1974 by American lichenologist Mason Hale.

== Description ==
The thallus is foliose and can grow up to 10 cm (4 in) in diameter. The upper surface of the thallus is yellowish-green to grayish-green in color, while the lower surface is black. The lichen produces apothecia, which are small, cup-shaped structures that contain the reproductive parts of the lichen. The apothecia are typically dark brown in color and can reach up to 5 mm (0.2 in) in diameter.

== Habitat and range ==
The lichen is found in high elevation regions around the globe including the Rocky Mountains of North America and Mongolia.

== See also ==
- List of Xanthoparmelia species
