= Xanthoparmelia subochracea =

Scientific classification
- Kingdom: Fungi
- Division: Ascomycota
- Class: Lecanoromycetes
- Order: Lecanorales
- Family: Parmeliaceae
- Genus: Xanthoparmelia
- Species: X. subochracea

Binomial name
- Xanthoparmelia subochracea Hale (1986)

Species of lichen

Xanthoparmelia subochracea is a species of saxicolous (rock-dwelling), foliose lichen in the family Parmeliaceae. Found in Southern Africa, it was formally described as a new species in 1986 by the American lichenologist Mason Hale. The type specimen was collected from Cape Province at an elevation of about 900 m (3,000 ft), where it was found growing on exfoliating granite outcrops in karoo vegetation. The lichen thallus, which is closely attached to its rock substrate, is bright yellowish green and measures 3–6 cm (1.2–2.4 in) in diameter. The lobes making up the thallus are somewhat irregularly shaped and are 1.5–2.5 mm wide, with rotund, black-rimmed tips. It contains protocetraric acid, usnic acid and skyrin.

== See also ==
- List of Xanthoparmelia species
