= Xanthoparmelia tablensis =

Scientific classification
- Kingdom: Fungi
- Division: Ascomycota
- Class: Lecanoromycetes
- Order: Lecanorales
- Family: Parmeliaceae
- Genus: Xanthoparmelia
- Species: X. tablensis

Binomial name
- Xanthoparmelia tablensis Hale (1986)

Species of lichen

Xanthoparmelia tablensis is a species of saxicolous (rock-dwelling), foliose lichen in the family Parmeliaceae. Found in South Africa, it was formally described as a new species in 1986 by the American lichenologist Mason Hale. The type specimen was collected from the Table Mountain Nature Reserve at an elevation of 1,000 m (3,300 ft), where it was found growing on a large sandstone ledge amongst fynbos vegetation. The thallus is loosely attached to its rock substrate and is bright yellowish green in colour, measuring 6–10 cm (2.4–3.9 in) broad. It contains hypoprotocetraric acid, 4-O-methylnotatic acid, and usnic acid.

== See also ==
- List of Xanthoparmelia species
