= Xanthoparmelia schmidtii =

Conservation status
- Critically Imperiled (NatureServe)

Scientific classification
- Kingdom: Fungi
- Division: Ascomycota
- Class: Lecanoromycetes
- Order: Lecanorales
- Family: Parmeliaceae
- Genus: Xanthoparmelia
- Species: X. schmidtii

Binomial name
- Xanthoparmelia schmidtii Hale (1984)

Species of lichen found in the USA

Xanthoparmelia schmidtii is a lichen which belongs to the Xanthoparmelia genus. It is uncommon, and is listed as endangered by the Nature Conservatory.

== Description ==
This lichen grows on rocks. It is about 4–8 cm in diameter with dark yellowish green lobes which are approximately 0.1-0.2 mm wide, 0.1-0.6 mm high. It has moderately patchy rhizines on the underside that are 0.3-0.6mm long and are pale to dark brown in color. Ithas the appearance of being a hybrid species, as its chemical makeup is unique to the foothill region of the Sierra Nevada.

== Habitat and range ==
It is found in the US state of California.

== See also ==
- List of Xanthoparmelia species
