= Xanthoparmelia oribensis =

Scientific classification
- Kingdom: Fungi
- Division: Ascomycota
- Class: Lecanoromycetes
- Order: Lecanorales
- Family: Parmeliaceae
- Genus: Xanthoparmelia
- Species: X. oribensis

Binomial name
- Xanthoparmelia oribensis Hale (1986)

Species of lichen

Xanthoparmelia oribensis is a species of saxicolous (rock-dwelling), foliose lichen in the family Parmeliaceae. Found in South Africa, it was formally described as a new species in 1986 by the American lichenologist Mason Hale. The type specimen was collected from the Oribi Gorge Nature Reserve (Natal) at an elevation of 300 m (980 ft), where it was found growing on flat sandstone exposures near a cliff. Its thallus is yellowish green and measure 6–12 cm (2.4–4.7 in) broad. It contains several secondary metabolites (lichen products): hypoprotocetraric acid, 4-O-demethylnotatic acid, usnic acid, skyrin, and minor levels of some unidentified substances.

== See also ==
- List of Xanthoparmelia species
