= List of Xanthoparmelia species =

This is a list of species in the foliose lichen genus Xanthoparmelia. It is the most speciose lichen genus, containing an estimated 822 species as of 2020. The key characteristics of Xanthoparmelia include the cell walls containing Xanthoparmelia-type lichenan, the pored epicortex, margins without cilia, simple rhizines, small, ellipsoidal spores and bifusiform or rarely weakly fusiform or bacilliform conidia.

== A ==
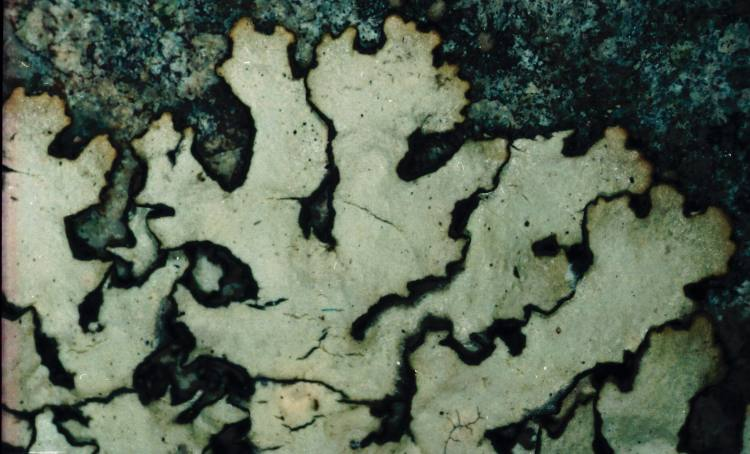
Xanthoparmelia angustiphylla

- Xanthoparmelia abraxas (Brusse) Elix (1997) – South Africa
- Xanthoparmelia acrita M.D.E.Knox & Hale (1986) – Africa
- Xanthoparmelia adamantea (Brusse) O.Blanco, A.Crespo, Elix, D.Hawksw. & Lumbsch (2004)
- Xanthoparmelia adhaerens (Nyl.) Hale (1974)
- Xanthoparmelia adlerae T.H.Nash, Elix & J.Johnst. (1987) – South America
- Xanthoparmelia adpicta (Zahlbr.) O.Blanco, A.Crespo, Elix, D.Hawksw. & Lumbsch (2004)
- Xanthoparmelia adusta (Kurok.) Elix (2003)\
- Xanthoparmelia afferensis (Essl.) O.Blanco, A.Crespo, Elix, D.Hawksw. & Lumbsch (2004)
- Xanthoparmelia affinis Hale (1987)
- Xanthoparmelia africana Hale (1986) – Africa
- Xanthoparmelia afroincerta Elix (1999) – Africa
- Xanthoparmelia afrolavicola Hale (1989)
- Xanthoparmelia agamalis (Brusse) Elix (2003)
- Xanthoparmelia aggregata M.D.E.Knox (1983) – Africa
- Xanthoparmelia ahtii (Essl.) O.Blanco, A.Crespo, Elix, D.Hawksw. & Lumbsch (2004)
- Xanthoparmelia ajoensis (T.H.Nash) Egan (1975)
- Xanthoparmelia albomaculata Hale (1985)
- Xanthoparmelia alectoronica Hale (1985)
- Xanthoparmelia alexandrensis Elix & J.Johnst. (1986)
- Xanthoparmelia aliphatica Hale (1986) – Africa
- Xanthoparmelia aliphaticella A.Thell, Feuerer, Elix & Kärnefelt (2006)
- Xanthoparmelia alligatensis Elix (2006) – Australia
- Xanthoparmelia almbornii (Hale) Hale (1974)
- Xanthoparmelia alternata Elix & J.Johnst. (1986)
- Xanthoparmelia amableana (Gyeln.) Hale (1988)
- Xanthoparmelia amphixantha (Müll.Arg.) Hale (1974)
- Xanthoparmelia amphixanthoides (J.Steiner & Zahlbr.) Hale (1974)
- Xanthoparmelia amplexula (Stirt.) Elix & J.Johnst. (1986)
- Xanthoparmelia amplexuloides Hale (1989)
- Xanthoparmelia angustiphylla (Gyeln.) Hale (1988)
- Xanthoparmelia annexa (Kurok.) Elix (2003)
- Xanthoparmelia antleriformis (Elix) Elix & J.Johnst. (1986)
- Xanthoparmelia applicata Hale (1987)
- Xanthoparmelia applicatella (Elix) O.Blanco, A.Crespo, Elix, D.Hawksw. & Lumbsch (2004)
- Xanthoparmelia aranaea (Elix & J.Johnst.) Elix (2003)
- Xanthoparmelia arapilensis (Elix & P.M.Armstr.) Filson (1984)
- Xanthoparmelia arcana (Kurok.) Elix (2003)
- Xanthoparmelia archeri (Elix) O.Blanco, A.Crespo, Elix, D.Hawksw. & Lumbsch (2004)
- Xanthoparmelia areolata Hale (1987) – Africa
- Xanthoparmelia arida Egan & Derstine (1979)
- Xanthoparmelia aridella Elix (2003)
- Xanthoparmelia arrecta (Essl.) O.Blanco, A.Crespo, Elix, D.Hawksw. & Lumbsch (2004)
- Xanthoparmelia arvidssonii T.H.Nash & Elix (1995)
- Xanthoparmelia asilaris (Brusse) Elix (2003)
- Xanthoparmelia assimilis (Brusse) Elix (1997) – South Africa
- Xanthoparmelia astricta (Brusse) Elix (2003)
- Xanthoparmelia atrobarbatica (Elix) O.Blanco, A.Crespo, Elix, D.Hawksw. & Lumbsch (2004)
- Xanthoparmelia atrocapnodes (Elix & J.Johnst.) Elix (2003)
- Xanthoparmelia atroventralis (Hale) Hale (1974)
- Xanthoparmelia atroviridis (Essl.) O.Blanco, A.Crespo, Elix, D.Hawksw. & Lumbsch (2004)
- Xanthoparmelia attica (Leuckert, Poelt & B.Schwarz) O.Blanco, A.Crespo, Elix, D.Hawksw. & Lumbsch (2004)
- Xanthoparmelia atticoides (Essl.) O.Blanco, A.Crespo, Elix, D.Hawksw. & Lumbsch (2004)
- Xanthoparmelia auricampa Elix (2006) – Australia
- Xanthoparmelia aurifera Elix & J.Johnst. (1986)
- Xanthoparmelia ausiana Hale (1989)
- Xanthoparmelia australasica D.J.Galloway (1981)
- Xanthoparmelia australiensis (Cromb.) Hale (1974)
- Xanthoparmelia austroafricana (Stirt.) Hale (1974)
- Xanthoparmelia austroalpina Elix (1995)
- Xanthoparmelia austroamericana Hale (1985)
- Xanthoparmelia austrocapensis Hale (1987)
- Xanthoparmelia austroconstrictans Elix (1993) – Australia
- Xanthoparmelia azaniensis (Brusse) A.Thell, Feuerer, Elix & Kärnefelt (2006)

== B ==
- Xanthoparmelia baeomycesica Elix (2006) – Australia
- Xanthoparmelia bainskloofensis Elix & T.H.Nash (2002) – Africa
- Xanthoparmelia ballingalliana Elix & J.Johnst. (1987) – Australia
- Xanthoparmelia barbatica (Elix) Egan (1982)
- Xanthoparmelia barbellata (Kurok.) Hale (1984)
- Xanthoparmelia barda (Brusse) Elix (2003)
- Xanthoparmelia barklyensis Hale (1986) – Africa
- Xanthoparmelia barthlottii Elix & U.Becker (1999)
- Xanthoparmelia bartlettii Kurok. (1989)
- Xanthoparmelia basutoensis (Hale) Elix (2003)
- Xanthoparmelia beatricea Hale (1987) – Africa
- Xanthoparmelia beccae Aptroot (2008)
- Xanthoparmelia beckeri O.Blanco, A.Crespo, Elix, D.Hawksw. & Lumbsch (2004)
- Xanthoparmelia bellatula (Kurok. & Filson) Elix & J.Johnst. (1986)
- Xanthoparmelia benyovszkyana (Gyel.) Hale (1974)
- Xanthoparmelia bibax (Brusse) Hale (1988)
- Xanthoparmelia bicolorans Elix & Kantvilas (1999) – Australia
- Xanthoparmelia bicontinens Elix & T.H.Nash (1987)
- Xanthoparmelia bihemispherica T.H.Nash & Elix (1995)
- Xanthoparmelia biloelensis Elix (2004) – Australia
- Xanthoparmelia blackdownensis Elix & J.Johnst. (1987) – Australia
- Xanthoparmelia boonahensis Elix & J.Johnst. (1988)
- Xanthoparmelia botryoides Kurok. (1989) – Japan
- Xanthoparmelia bourgeanica (Elix) Elix (2003)
- Xanthoparmelia boyaginensis Elix (2007)
- Xanthoparmelia boyeri Elix (2002) – Africa
- Xanthoparmelia brachinaensis (Elix) O.Blanco, A.Crespo, Elix, D.Hawksw. & Lumbsch (2004)
- Xanthoparmelia brandwagensis (Elix) O.Blanco, A.Crespo, Elix, D.Hawksw. & Lumbsch (2004)
- Xanthoparmelia brattii (Essl.) O.Blanco, A.Crespo, Elix, D.Hawksw. & Lumbsch (2004)
- Xanthoparmelia brasiliensis T.H.Nash & Elix (1995)
- Xanthoparmelia brevilobata Hale (1987) – Africa
- Xanthoparmelia brownlieae (Elix & J.Johnst.) Elix (2003)
- Xanthoparmelia brunella (Essl.) O.Blanco, A.Crespo, Elix, D.Hawksw. & Lumbsch (2004)
- Xanthoparmelia brunnthaleri (J.Steiner & Zahlbr.) Hale (1974)
- Xanthoparmelia brussei (Elix) O.Blanco, A.Crespo, Elix, D.Hawksw. & Lumbsch (2004)
- Xanthoparmelia buedelii O.Blanco, A.Crespo, Elix, D.Hawksw. & Lumbsch (2004)
- Xanthoparmelia bulfiniana (Elix) O.Blanco, A.Crespo, Elix, D.Hawksw. & Lumbsch (2004)
- Xanthoparmelia bullabullensis Elix (2007)
- Xanthoparmelia bungendorensis (Elix) Elix & J.Johnst. (1986)
- Xanthoparmelia burmeisteri (Elix) Egan (1982)

== C ==
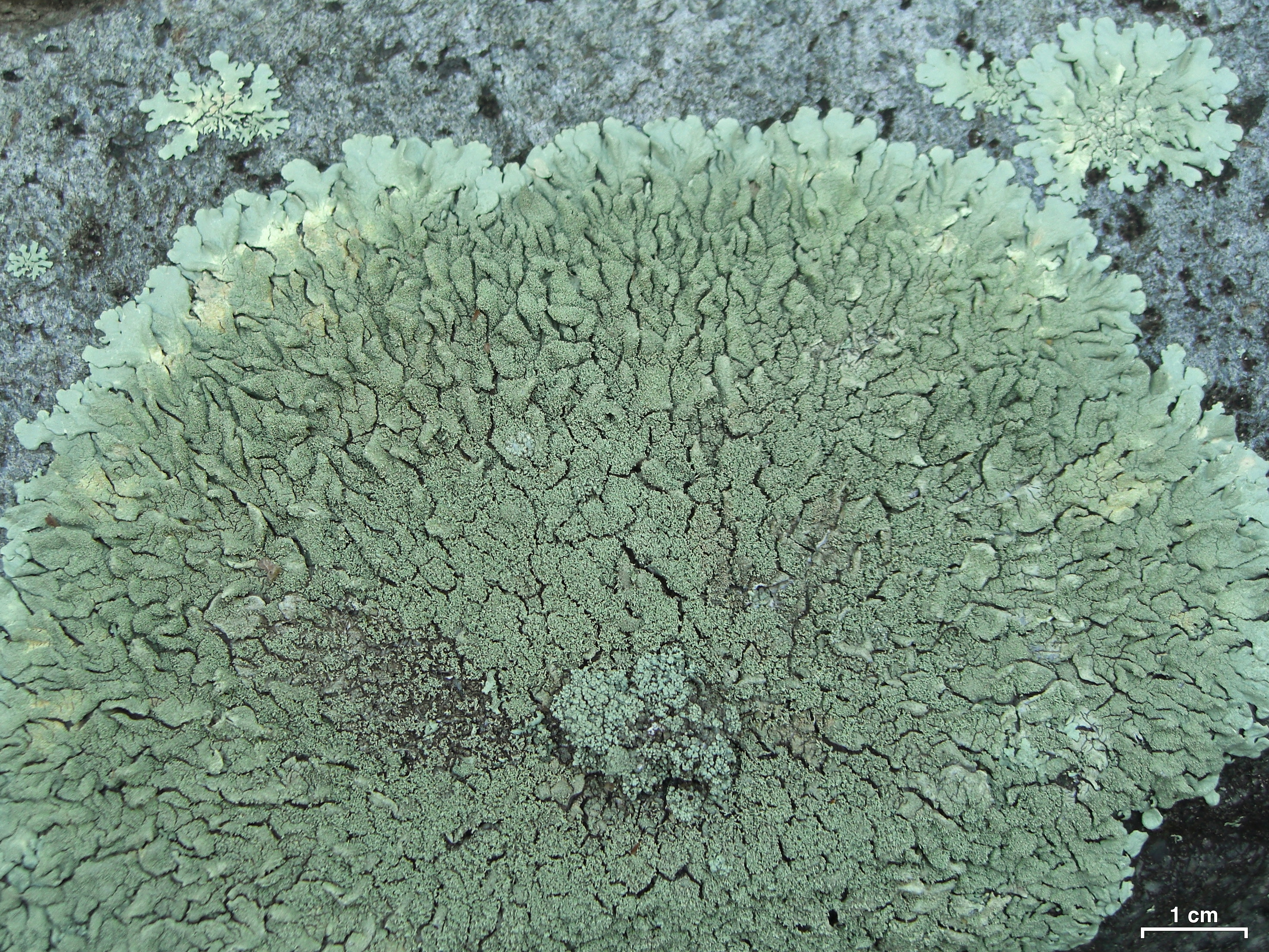
Xanthoparmelia conspersa

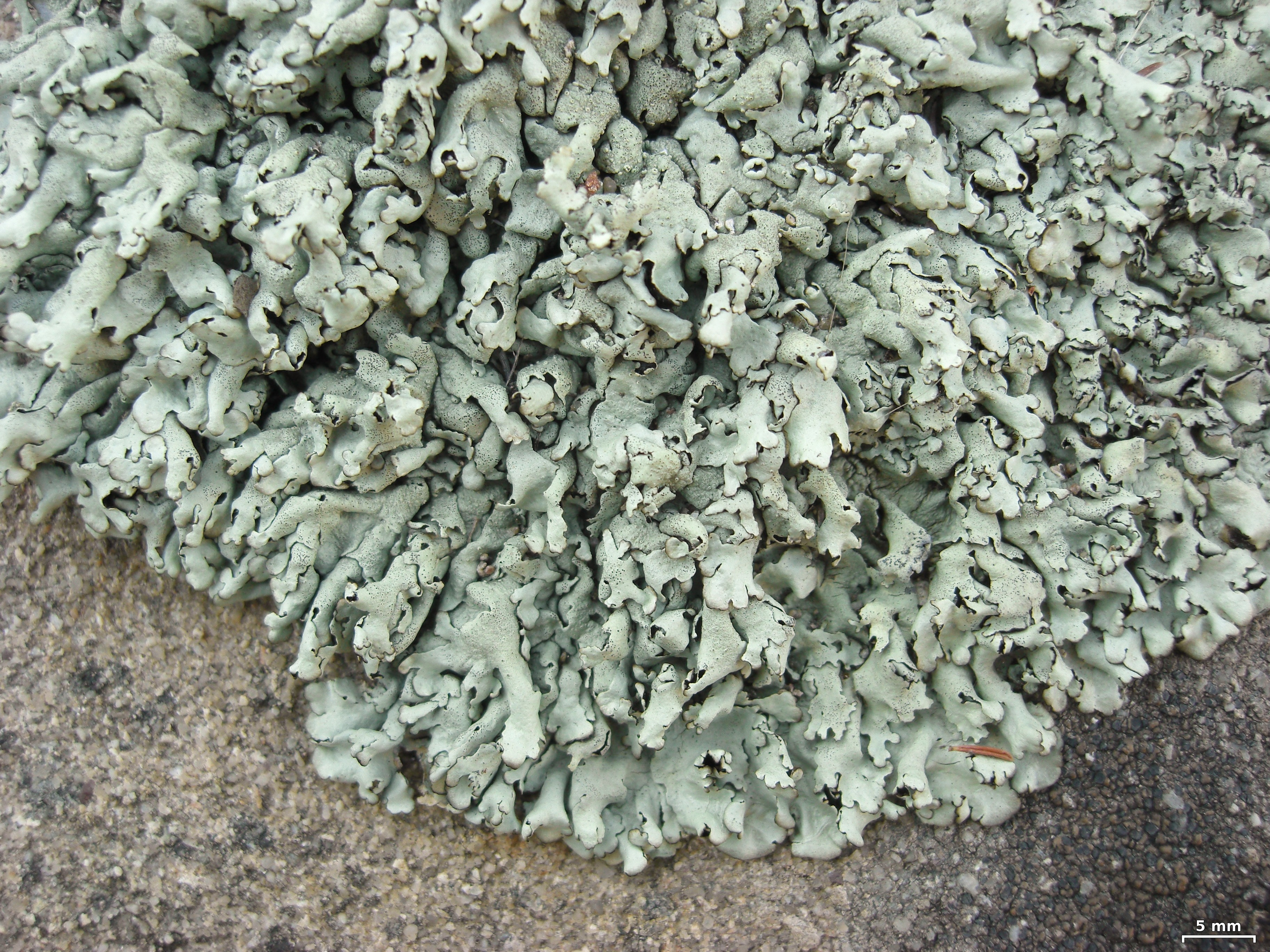
Xanthoparmelia cumberlandia

- Xanthoparmelia calida Elix & J.Johnst. (1987) – Australia
- Xanthoparmelia californica Hale (1984)
- Xanthoparmelia caliginosa (Essl.) O.Blanco, A.Crespo, Elix, D.Hawksw. & Lumbsch (2004)
- Xanthoparmelia callifolioides Adler, Elix & J.Johnst. (1988)
- Xanthoparmelia calvinia Hale (1986) – Africa
- Xanthoparmelia camtschadalis (Ach.) Hale (1974)
- Xanthoparmelia canobolasensis Elix (1993) – Australia
- Xanthoparmelia caparidensis (Elix) O.Blanco, A.Crespo, Elix, D.Hawksw. & Lumbsch (2004)
- Xanthoparmelia capensis Hale (1986) – Africa
- Xanthoparmelia capnoexillima Elix (2006) – Australia
- Xanthoparmelia catarinae Hale (1989)
- Xanthoparmelia cedri-montana Brusse (1983) – Africa
- Xanthoparmelia centralis Elix & J.Johnst. (1986)
- Xanthoparmelia ceresella (Elix) O.Blanco, A.Crespo, Elix, D.Hawksw. & Lumbsch (2004)
- Xanthoparmelia ceresensis Hale (1986) – Africa
- Xanthoparmelia ceresina (Lynge) Hale (1998)
- Xanthoparmelia cerussata (Kurok.) Elix (2003)
- Xanthoparmelia chalybaeizans (J.Steiner & Zahlbr.) Hale (1974)
- Xanthoparmelia cheelii (Gyeln.) Hale (1974)
- Xanthoparmelia chionophila (Brusse) Elix (1997)
- Xanthoparmelia chiricahuensis (R.A.Anderson & W.A.Weber) O.Blanco, A.Crespo, Elix, D.Hawksw. & Lumbsch (2004)
- Xanthoparmelia chlorochroa (Tuck.) Hale (1974)
- Xanthoparmelia chudalupensis (Elix) O.Blanco, A.Crespo, Elix, D.Hawksw. & Lumbsch (2004)
- Xanthoparmelia cirrhomedullosa Hale (1989)
- Xanthoparmelia claviculata Kurok. (1989) – Japan
- Xanthoparmelia clivorum (Brusse) Hale (1988)
- Xanthoparmelia colensoica T.H.Nash, Elix & J.Johnst. (1988)
- Xanthoparmelia colensoides Elix (2003)
- Xanthoparmelia coloradoensis (Gyeln.) Hale (1988)
- Xanthoparmelia colorata (Gyeln.) Hale (1974)
- Xanthoparmelia columbariensis (Elix & J.Johnst.) Elix (2003)
- Xanthoparmelia commonii Elix & T.H.Nash (1999)
- Xanthoparmelia competita Hale (1986) – Africa
- Xanthoparmelia concolor (Spreng.) Hale (1974)
- Xanthoparmelia concomitans Elix & J.Johnst. (1986)
- Xanthoparmelia condaminensis Elix & J.Johnst. (1987) – Australia
- Xanthoparmelia condyloides (Kurok.) Elix (2003)
- Xanthoparmelia coneruptens Hale (1989)
- Xanthoparmelia congensis (J.Steiner) Hale (1974)
- Xanthoparmelia congesta (Kurok. & Filson) Elix & J.Johnst. (1986)
- Xanthoparmelia conglomerata Canêz & Marcelli (2008)
- Xanthoparmelia conjuncta Hale (1989)
- Xanthoparmelia conranensis (Elix) Elix (2003)
- Xanthoparmelia consociata (Elix) Elix & J.Johnst. (1986)
- Xanthoparmelia conspersa (Ehrh. ex Ach.) Hale (1974)
- Xanthoparmelia conspersula (Nyl.) Hale (1974)
- Xanthoparmelia constipata (Kurok. & Filson) Elix & J.Johnst. (1986)
- Xanthoparmelia contrasta Hale (1987) – Africa
- Xanthoparmelia conturbata (Müll.Arg.) O.Blanco, A.Crespo, Elix, D.Hawksw. & Lumbsch (2004)
- Xanthoparmelia convexa (Elix) O.Blanco, A.Crespo, Elix, D. Hawksw. & Lumbsch (2004)
- Xanthoparmelia convexula (Müll. Arg.) Hale (1988)
- Xanthoparmelia convoluta (Kremp.) Hale (1974)
- Xanthoparmelia convolutella Elix (1997)
- Xanthoparmelia convolutoides Elix (2006) – Australia
- Xanthoparmelia cordillerana (Gyeln.) Hale (1974)
- Xanthoparmelia coreana (Gyeln.) Hale (1988)
- Xanthoparmelia coriacea Hale (1987) – Africa
- Xanthoparmelia cotopaxiensis T.H.Nash, Elix & J.Johnst. (1987)
- Xanthoparmelia cranfieldii Elix (2003) – Australia
- Xanthoparmelia crassilobata Hale (1986) – Africa
- Xanthoparmelia cravenii Elix & J.Johnst. (1986)
- Xanthoparmelia crawfordensis (Elix) Elix (2003)
- Xanthoparmelia crespoae Elix, Louwhoff & M.Molina (2000)
- Xanthoparmelia crustulosa (Essl.) O.Blanco, A.Crespo, Elix, D.Hawksw. & Lumbsch (2004)
- Xanthoparmelia crystallicola (Kalb & Hale) T.H.Nash & Elix (1995)
- Xanthoparmelia cumberlandia (Gyeln.) Hale (1974)
- Xanthoparmelia curnowiae Elix (2006) – Australia
- Xanthoparmelia cylindriloba M.D.E.Knox (1983) – Africa

== D ==
- Xanthoparmelia dapperensis Elix (2007)
- Xanthoparmelia darlingensis Elix & J.Johnst. (1987) – Australia
- Xanthoparmelia dayiana (Elix & P.M.Armstr.) Elix & J.Johnst. (1986)
- Xanthoparmelia delisei (Duby) O.Blanco, A.Crespo, Elix, D.Hawksw. & Lumbsch (2004)
- Xanthoparmelia delisiella (Elix) O.Blanco, A.Crespo, Elix, D.Hawksw. & Lumbsch (2004)
- Xanthoparmelia denudata Hale (1986)
- Xanthoparmelia depsidella (Elix) O.Blanco, A.Crespo, Elix, D.Hawksw. & Lumbsch (2004)
- Xanthoparmelia desertorum (Elenkin) Hale (1988)
- Xanthoparmelia diacida Hale (1986) – Africa
- Xanthoparmelia diadeta (Hale) Hale (1974)
- Xanthoparmelia dichotoma (Müll.Arg.) Hale (1974)
- Xanthoparmelia dichromatica (Hale) Hale (1974)
- Xanthoparmelia dierythra (Hale) Hale (1974)
- Xanthoparmelia diffractaica Hale (1987) – Africa
- Xanthoparmelia digitiformis (Elix & P.M.Armstr.) Filson (1984)
- Xanthoparmelia dissensa (T.H.Nash) Egan (1974)
- Xanthoparmelia dissitifolia Kurok. (1986)
- Xanthoparmelia diutina (Brusse) O.Blanco, A.Crespo, Elix, D.Hawksw. & Lumbsch (2004)
- Xanthoparmelia domboensis (Elix & U.Becker) O.Blanco, A.Crespo, Elix, D.Hawksw. & Lumbsch (2004)
- Xanthoparmelia domokosii (Gyeln.) Hale (1974)
- Xanthoparmelia domokosioides Elix & T.H.Nash (1999) – Africa
- Xanthoparmelia donneri Elix & J.Johnst. (1986)
- Xanthoparmelia dregeana (Hampe) O.Blanco, A.Crespo, Elix, D.Hawksw. & Lumbsch (2004)
- Xanthoparmelia dubitata Elix & J.Johnst. (1986)
- Xanthoparmelia dubitella Elix (2007) – Africa
- Xanthoparmelia duplicata Hale (1986) – Africa
- Xanthoparmelia durietzii Hale (1987)
- Xanthoparmelia dwaasbergensis (Brusse) Elix (2003)
- Xanthoparmelia dysprosa Brusse & M.D.E.Knox (1983) – Africa

== E ==
- Xanthoparmelia echidnaformis Elix (2006) – Australia
- Xanthoparmelia echinocarpica T.H.Nash & Elix (1995)
- Xanthoparmelia effigurata Hale (1986) – Africa
- Xanthoparmelia eganii Elix & T.H.Nash (1999)
- Xanthoparmelia eilifii Elix & J.Johnst. (1986)
- Xanthoparmelia elaeodes (Elix) Elix & J.Johnst. (1986)
- Xanthoparmelia eldridgei (Elix) O.Blanco, A.Crespo, Elix, D.Hawksw. & Lumbsch (2004)
- Xanthoparmelia elevata Elix (2003) – Australia
- Xanthoparmelia elixii Filson (1984)
- Xanthoparmelia emolumenta (Brusse) Elix (1997)
- Xanthoparmelia endochromatica Hale (1986) – Africa
- Xanthoparmelia endochrysea (Müll. Arg.) Hale (1988)
- Xanthoparmelia endomiltodes (Nyl.) Hale (1974)
- Xanthoparmelia enteroxantha Hale (1986) – Africa
- Xanthoparmelia epacridea (Brusse) Elix (1997)
- Xanthoparmelia epheboides (Zahlbr.) O.Blanco, A.Crespo, Elix, D.Hawksw. & Lumbsch (2004)
- Xanthoparmelia epigaea Hale (1986) – Africa
- Xanthoparmelia equalis Hale (1986) – Africa
- Xanthoparmelia erebea (Brusse) Elix (2003)
- Xanthoparmelia erosa (Elix & P.M.Armstr.) Elix & J.Johnst. (1986)
- Xanthoparmelia eruptens Hale (1987) – Africa
- Xanthoparmelia erythrocardia (Müll.Arg.) O.Blanco, A.Crespo, Elix, D.Hawksw. & Lumbsch (2004)
- Xanthoparmelia esslingeri O.Blanco, A.Crespo, Elix, D.Hawksw. & Lumbsch (2004)
- Xanthoparmelia esterhuyseniae Hale (1986) – Africa
- Xanthoparmelia everardensis (Elix & P.M.Armstr.) Elix & J.Johnst. (1986)
- Xanthoparmelia evernica Hale (1986) – Africa
- Xanthoparmelia ewersii Elix (2006) – Australia
- Xanthoparmelia examplaris Elix & J.Johnst. (1986)
- Xanthoparmelia exillima (Elix) Elix & J.Johnst. (1986)
- Xanthoparmelia exuviata (Kurok.) Hale (1984)

== F ==
- Xanthoparmelia fangii Elix (2006) – Australia
- Xanthoparmelia farinosa (Vain.) T.H.Nash, Elix & J.Johnst. (1987)
- Xanthoparmelia fausta (Brusse) Elix (2003)
- Xanthoparmelia felkaensis (Gyelnik) Hale (1988)
- Xanthoparmelia ferraroiana T.H.Nash, Elix & J.Johnst. (1987)
- Xanthoparmelia ferruma Elix & J.Johnst. (1986)
- Xanthoparmelia festiva (Brusse) Elix (1997)
- Xanthoparmelia filarszkyana (Gyeln.) Hale (1974)
- Xanthoparmelia filsonii Elix & J.Johnst. (1986)
- Xanthoparmelia fissurina (Zahlbr.) O.Blanco, A.Crespo, Elix, D.Hawksw. & Lumbsch (2004)
- Xanthoparmelia flavescentireagens (Gyeln.) D.J.Galloway (1981)
- Xanthoparmelia flindersiana (Elix & P.M.Armstr.) Elix & J.Johnst. (1986)
- Xanthoparmelia follmannii (J.C.Krug) O.Blanco, A.Crespo, Elix, D.Hawksw. & Lumbsch (2004)
- Xanthoparmelia formosana Kurok. (2001)
- Xanthoparmelia foveolata (Essl.) O.Blanco, A.Crespo, Elix, D.Hawksw. & Lumbsch (2004)
- Xanthoparmelia fracticollis Elix (2004) – Australia
- Xanthoparmelia franklinensis (Elix) O.Blanco, A.Crespo, Elix, D.Hawksw. & Lumbsch (2004)
- Xanthoparmelia freycinetiana Elix & Kantvilas (2009) – Australia
- Xanthoparmelia fucina M.D.E.Knox (1983) – Africa
- Xanthoparmelia fumarafricana Elix (1999) – Africa
- Xanthoparmelia fumarprotocetrarica (Elix & J.Johnst.) Elix (2003)
- Xanthoparmelia fumigata (Kurok.) Elix & J.Johnst. (1987) – Australia
- Xanthoparmelia furcata (Müll. Arg.) Hale (1974)
- Xanthoparmelia fynbosiana (Elix) Elix (2003)

== G ==
- Xanthoparmelia ganymedea (Brusse) G.Amo, A.Crespo, Elix & Lumbsch (2010)
- Xanthoparmelia geesterani (Hale) Hale & Elix (1988)
- Xanthoparmelia gemmulifera (Elix & T.H.Nash) Elix (2003)
- Xanthoparmelia gerhardii Elix & J.Johnst. (1988)
- Xanthoparmelia glabrans (Nyl.) O.Blanco, A.Crespo, Elix, D.Hawksw. & Lumbsch (2004)
- Xanthoparmelia glareosa (Kurok. & Filson) Elix & J.Johnst. (1986)
- Xanthoparmelia globisidiosa Hale (1986) – Africa
- Xanthoparmelia globulifera (Kurok. & Filson) Hale (1984)
- Xanthoparmelia glomelliferonica (Elix) O.Blanco, A.Crespo, Elix, D.Hawksw. & Lumbsch (2004)
- Xanthoparmelia glomerulata Krog & Swinscow (1987)
- Xanthoparmelia gongylodes Elix & J.Johnst. (1986)
- Xanthoparmelia graniticola (Elix & Kantvilas) O.Blanco, A.Crespo, Elix, D.Hawksw. & Lumbsch (2004)
- Xanthoparmelia granulata Hale (1989)
- Xanthoparmelia gregaria (Elix & J.Johnst.) Elix (2003)
- Xanthoparmelia greytonensis Hale (1990)
- Xanthoparmelia gyrophorica Hale (1986) – Africa

== H ==
- Xanthoparmelia hafellneri Elix (1999) – Australia
- Xanthoparmelia halei (Essl., Barbero & Llimona) O.Blanco, A.Crespo, Elix, D.Hawksw. & Lumbsch (2004)
- Xanthoparmelia harrisii Hale (1989)
- Xanthoparmelia heinarii Elix & J.Johnst. (1988)
- Xanthoparmelia hensseniae O.Blanco, A.Crespo, Elix, D.Hawksw. & Lumbsch (2004)
- Xanthoparmelia heterodoxa (Hale) Hale (1974)
- Xanthoparmelia hirosakiensis (Gyeln.) Kurok. (1989) – Japan
- Xanthoparmelia hondensis Elix & U.Becker (1999)
- Xanthoparmelia hottentotta (Ach.) A.Thell, Feuerer, Elix & Kärnefelt (2006)
- Xanthoparmelia huachucensis (T.H.Nash) Egan (1975)
- Xanthoparmelia hueana (Gyeln.) O.Blanco, A.Crespo, Elix, D.Hawksw. & Lumbsch (2004)
- Xanthoparmelia huttonii (Louwhoff & Elix) Elix (2003)
- Xanthoparmelia hybrida Hale (1986) – Africa
- Xanthoparmelia hybridella Elix (2007)
- Xanthoparmelia hybridiza Elix & J.Johnst. (1987) – Australia
- Xanthoparmelia hypoconstictica (Elix & J.Johnst.) Elix (2003)
- Xanthoparmelia hypoleiella Elix (1997) – Australia
- Xanthoparmelia hypomelaena (Hale) Hale (1974)
- Xanthoparmelia hypomelaenoides Elix & J.Johnst. (1986)
- Xanthoparmelia hypoprotocetrarica (Kurok. & Elix) Hale (1974)
- Xanthoparmelia hypopsila (Müll.Arg.) Hale (1974)
- Xanthoparmelia hyporhytida (Hale) Hale (1974)
- Xanthoparmelia hyposalazinica Elix (1993) – Australia
- Xanthoparmelia hypostictica T.H.Nash & Elix (1995)
- Xanthoparmelia hypothamnolica Elix & U.Becker (1999)

== I ==
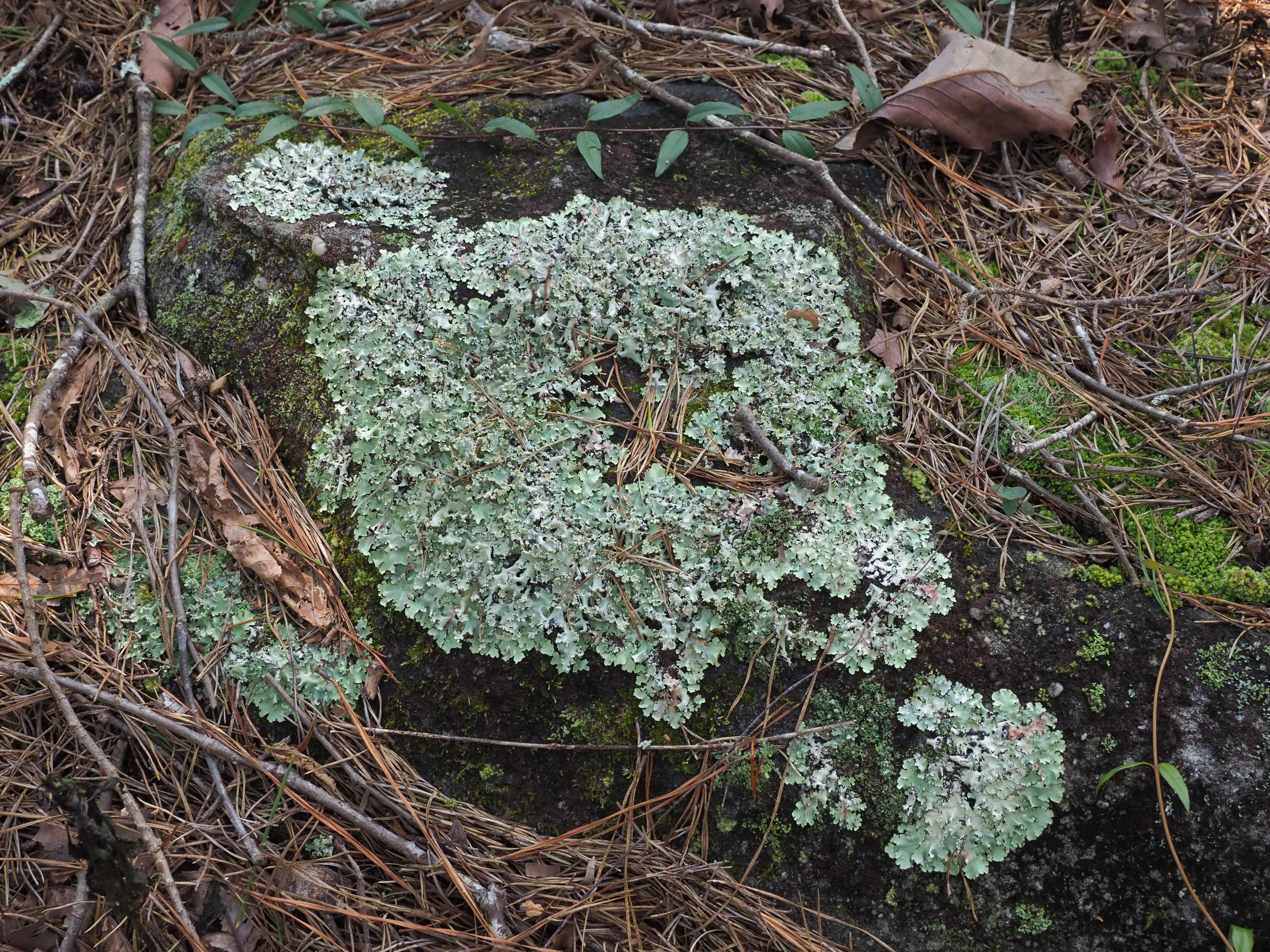
Xanthoparmelia isidiascens

- Xanthoparmelia ianthina Brusse (1983)
- Xanthoparmelia idahoensis Hale (1989)
- Xanthoparmelia imbricata Hale (1989)
- Xanthoparmelia imitatricoides (Elix) O.Blanco, A.Crespo, Elix, D.Hawksw. & Lumbsch (2004)
- Xanthoparmelia imitatrix (Taylor) O.Blanco, A.Crespo, Elix, D.Hawksw. & Lumbsch (2004)
- Xanthoparmelia immutata Elix & J.Johnst. (1986)
- Xanthoparmelia incantata (Essl.) O.Blanco, A.Crespo, Elix, D.Hawksw. & Lumbsch (2004)
- Xanthoparmelia incerta (Kurok. & Filson) Elix & J.Johnst. (1986)
- Xanthoparmelia incomposita (Essl.) O.Blanco, A.Crespo, Elix, D.Hawksw. & Lumbsch (2004)
- Xanthoparmelia inconspicua Hale (1987) – Africa
- Xanthoparmelia inconspicuella Elix (2003)
- Xanthoparmelia incrustata (Kurok. & Filson) Elix & J.Johnst. (1986)
- Xanthoparmelia indumenica Hale (1986) – Africa
- Xanthoparmelia infausta (Brusse) Elix (1997)
- Xanthoparmelia inflata Hale (1989)
- Xanthoparmelia infrapallida (Essl.) O.Blanco, A.Crespo, Elix, D.Hawksw. & Lumbsch (2004)
- Xanthoparmelia iniquita Elix & J.Johnst. (1986)
- Xanthoparmelia inopinata Elix (2006) – Australia
- Xanthoparmelia inops (Brusse) Elix (2003)
- Xanthoparmelia inselbergia (Elix) Elix (2003)
- Xanthoparmelia inuncta (Brusse) Hale (1988)
- Xanthoparmelia ischnoides (Kurok.) Elix (2003)
- Xanthoparmelia isidiascens Hale (1984)
- Xanthoparmelia isidiigera (Müll.Arg.) Elix & J.Johnst. (1986)
- Xanthoparmelia isidiosa (Müll.Arg.) Elix & J.Johnst. (1986)
- Xanthoparmelia isidiotegeta Elix & Kantvilas (1999)
- Xanthoparmelia isidiovagans O.Blanco, A.Crespo, Divakar & Elix (2005) – Spain

== J ==
- Xanthoparmelia jarmaniae Elix & Kantvilas (1995)
- Xanthoparmelia joranadia (T.H.Nash) Hale (1974)
- Xanthoparmelia juxtata (Elix) Elix (2003)

== K ==
- Xanthoparmelia kalbarriensis Elix (1999) – Australia
- Xanthoparmelia kalbii Hale (1984)
- Xanthoparmelia karolinensis Elix (2006) – Australia
- Xanthoparmelia karoo M.D.E.Knox & Brusse (1983) – Africa
- Xanthoparmelia karooensis Hale (1986) – Africa
- Xanthoparmelia kasachstania Hale (1990)
- Xanthoparmelia kashiwadanii T.H.Nash & Elix (1995)
- Xanthoparmelia kenyana (Essl.) O.Blanco, A.Crespo, Elix, D.Hawksw. & Lumbsch (2004)
- Xanthoparmelia keralensis Hale (1985)
- Xanthoparmelia khomasiana Hale (1989)
- Xanthoparmelia kiboensis (C.W.Dodge) Krog & Swinscow (1987)
- Xanthoparmelia kimberleyensis Elix (2003) – Australia
- Xanthoparmelia klauskalbii Elix (2007)
- Xanthoparmelia kleinswartbergensis Elix (2002) – Africa
- Xanthoparmelia knoxii Elix (1999) – Africa
- Xanthoparmelia knudsenii Elix, A.Thell & Søchting (2009)
- Xanthoparmelia kolriana Jayalal, Divakar & Hur (2014) – South Korea
- Xanthoparmelia kondininensis (Elix) O.Blanco, A.Crespo, Elix, D.Hawksw. & Lumbsch (2004)
- Xanthoparmelia kosciuszkoensis Elix (2004) – Australia
- Xanthoparmelia kotisephola Hale (1989)
- Xanthoparmelia krogiae Hale & Elix (1988)

== L ==
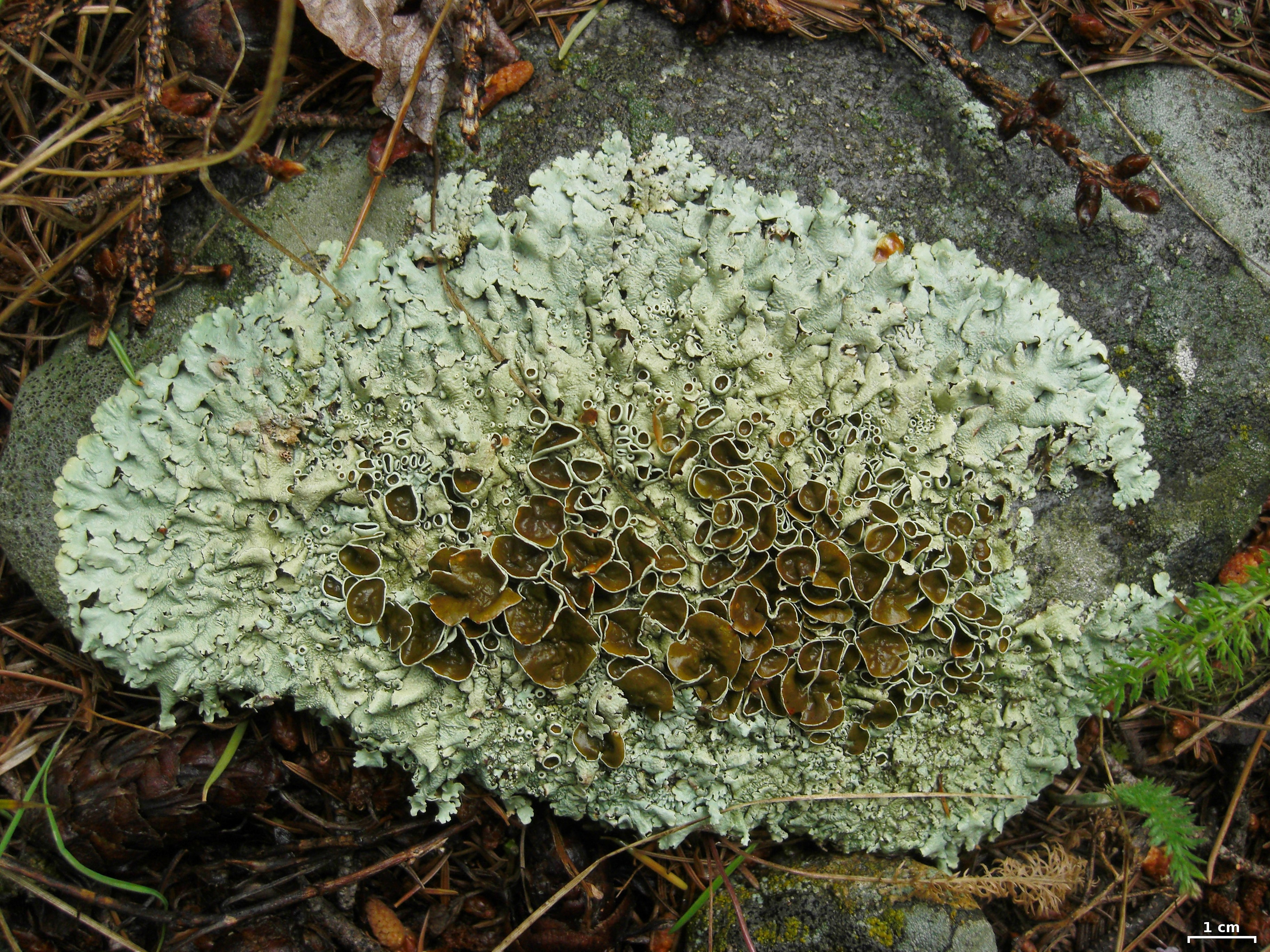
Xanthoparmelia lineola

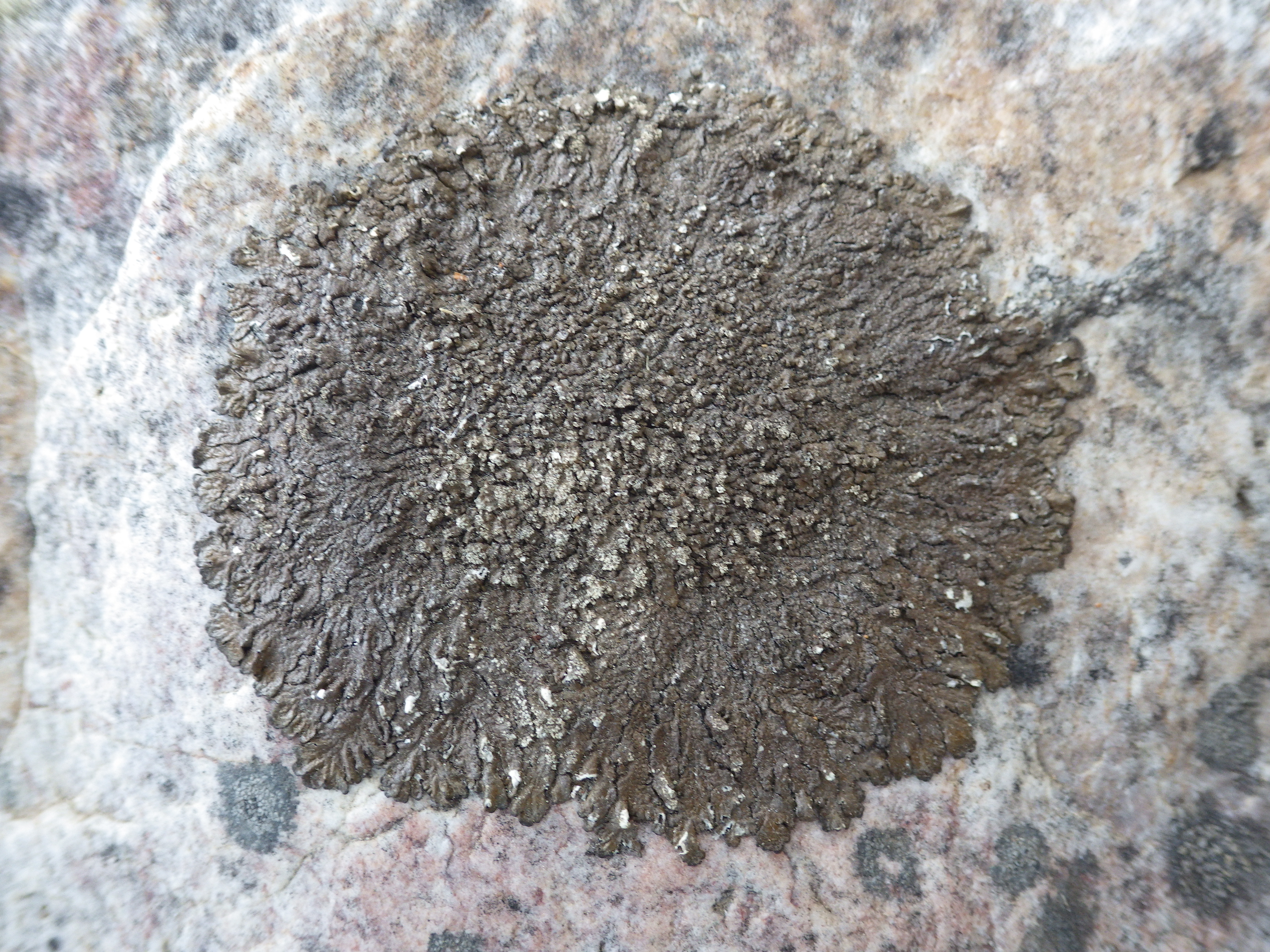
Xanthoparmelia loxodes

- Xanthoparmelia laciniata Hale (1987) – Africa
- Xanthoparmelia lagunebergensis Hale (1986) – Africa
- Xanthoparmelia latilobata Hale (1987) – Africa
- Xanthoparmelia lavicola (Gyeln.) Hale (1988)
- Xanthoparmelia laxchalybaeizans Hale (1987) – Africa
- Xanthoparmelia laxencrustans Elix & J.Johnst. (1986)
- Xanthoparmelia lecanoracea (Müll.Arg.) Hale (1986) – Africa
- Xanthoparmelia lecanorica (Hale) Hale (1974)
- Xanthoparmelia leppii (Elix) O.Blanco, A.Crespo, Elix, D.Hawksw. & Lumbsch (2004)
- Xanthoparmelia lesothoensis Hale (1986) – Africa
- Xanthoparmelia leucophaea (Elix & J.Johnst.) Elix (2003)
- Xanthoparmelia leucostigma Brusse (1983) – Africa
- Xanthoparmelia lichinoidea (Nyl. ex Cromb.) O.Blanco, A.Crespo, Elix, D.Hawksw. & Lumbsch (2004)
- Xanthoparmelia lineella (Essl.) O.Blanco, A.Crespo, Elix, D.Hawksw. & Lumbsch (2004)
- Xanthoparmelia lineola (E.C.Berry) Hale (1974)
- Xanthoparmelia lipochlorochroa Hale & Elix (1989)
- Xanthoparmelia lithophila (Kurok.) Elix (2003)
- Xanthoparmelia lithophiloides (Kurok.) Elix (2003)
- Xanthoparmelia lividica Hale (1986) – Africa
- Xanthoparmelia lobarica (Elix) O.Blanco, A.Crespo, Elix, D.Hawksw. & Lumbsch (2004)
- Xanthoparmelia lobulatella T.H.Nash & Elix (2004)
- Xanthoparmelia lobulifera Hale (1986) – Africa
- Xanthoparmelia lobuliferella Elix (2002) – Africa
- Xanthoparmelia lopezii T.H.Nash & Elix (1995)
- Xanthoparmelia loriloba (Essl.) O.Blanco, A.Crespo, Elix, D.Hawksw. & Lumbsch (2004)
- Xanthoparmelia louisii Elix & J.Johnst. (1986)
- Xanthoparmelia loxodella (Essl.) O.Blanco, A.Crespo, Elix, D.Hawksw. & Lumbsch (2004)
- Xanthoparmelia loxodes (Nyl.) O.Blanco, A.Crespo, Elix, D.Hawksw. & Lumbsch (2004)
- Xanthoparmelia lucrosa (Brusse) Elix (1997)
- Xanthoparmelia luderitziana Hale (1989)
- Xanthoparmelia lumbschii (Elix) Elix (2003)
- Xanthoparmelia luminosa (Elix) Hale (1984)
- Xanthoparmelia luteonotata (J.Steiner) O.Blanco, A.Crespo, Elix, D.Hawksw. & Lumbsch (2004)
- Xanthoparmelia lynii Elix & J.Johnst. (1988)
- Xanthoparmelia lyrigera (Brusse) G.Amo, A.Crespo, Elix & Lumbsch (2010)

== M ==
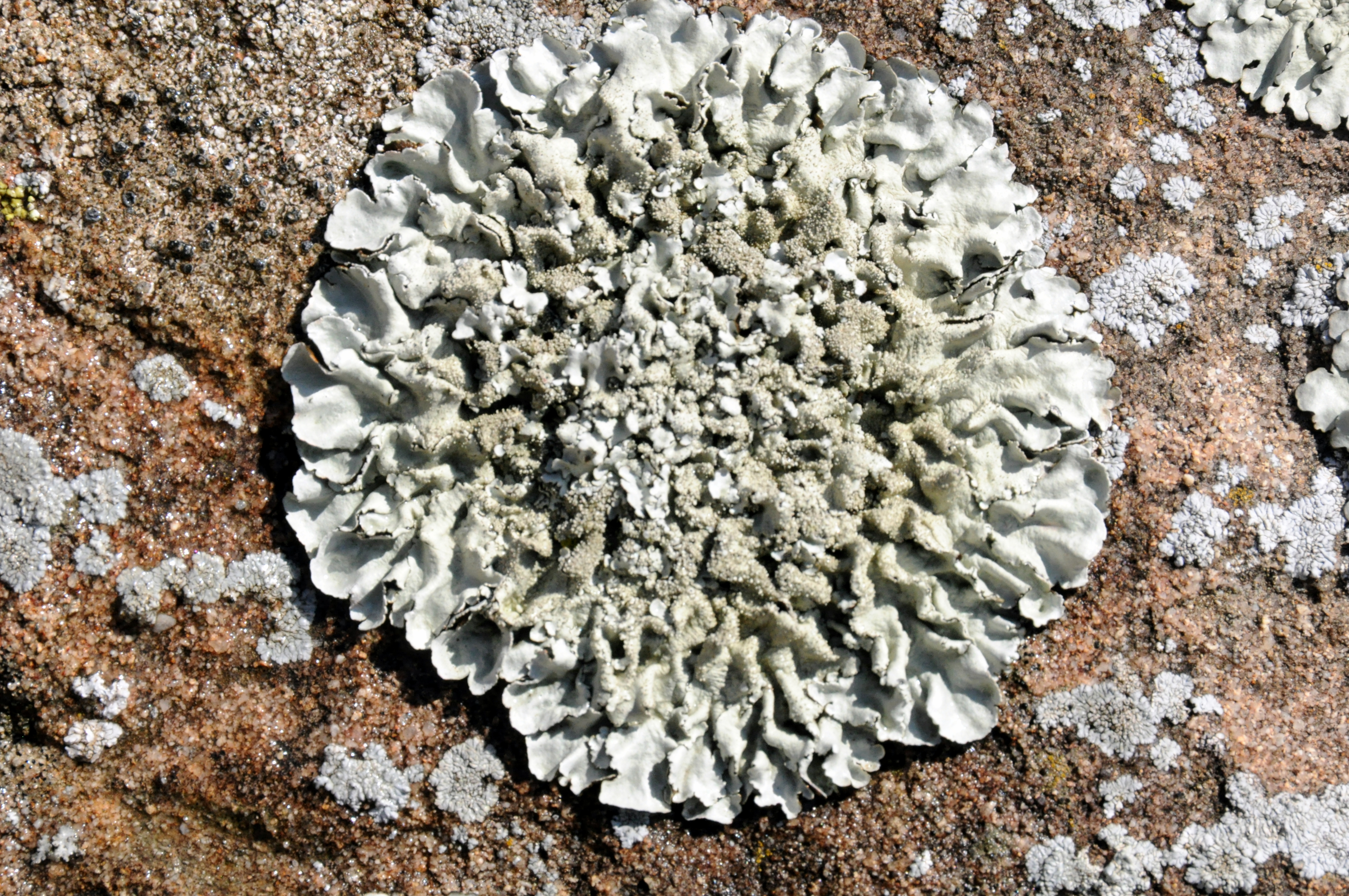
Xanthoparmelia mexicana

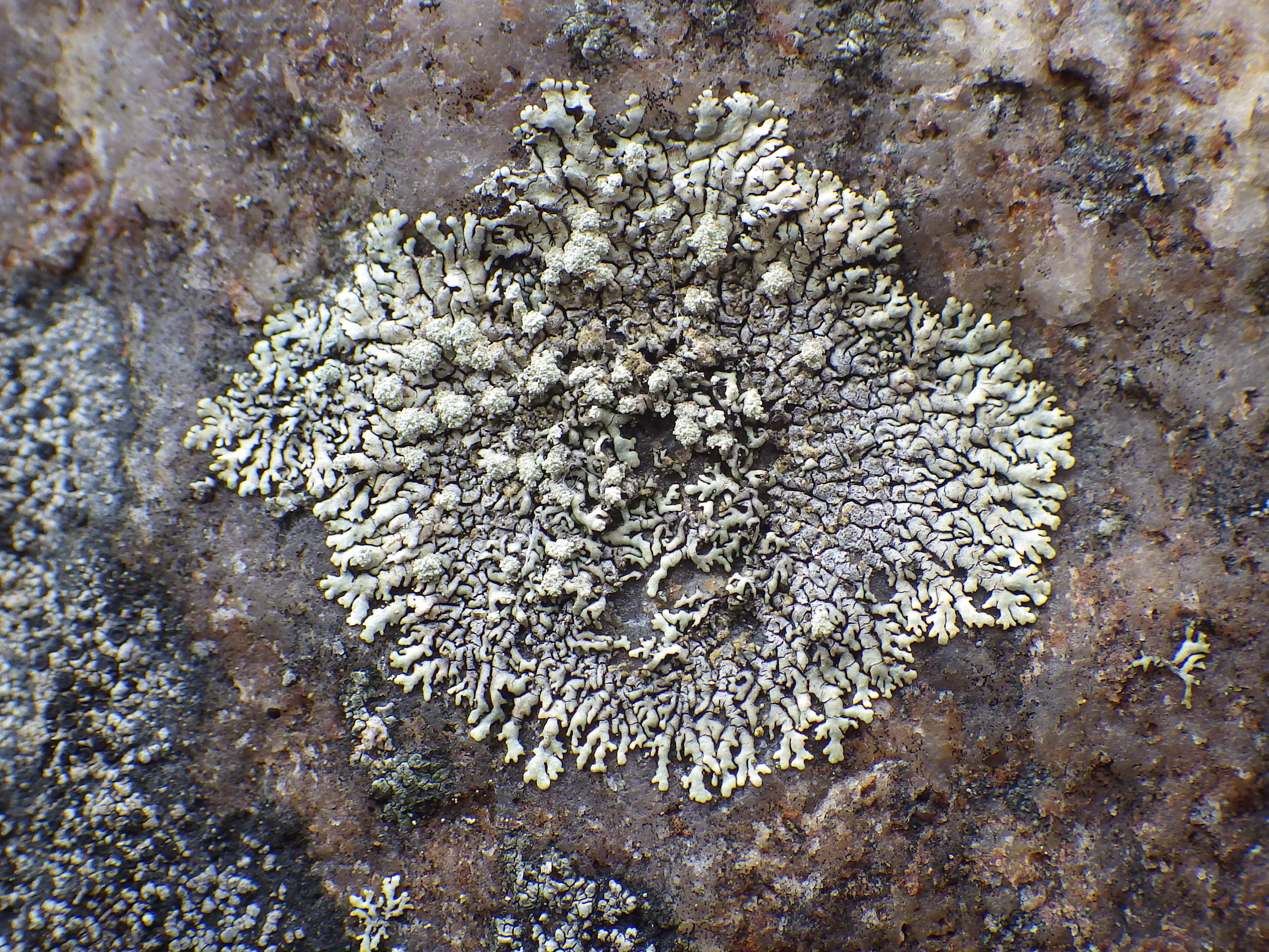
Xanthoparmelia mougeotii

- Xanthoparmelia maccarthyi Elix (1997) – Australia
- Xanthoparmelia maculodecipiens Elix (1999) – Africa
- Xanthoparmelia madeirensis Elix & Schumm (2003)
- Xanthoparmelia magnificans Elix (1999) – Africa
- Xanthoparmelia mahuiana T.H.Nash & Elix (1995)
- Xanthoparmelia malawiensis Elix (2002) – Africa
- Xanthoparmelia malcolmii (Elix) O.Blanco, A.Crespo, Elix, D.Hawksw. & Lumbsch (2004)
- Xanthoparmelia manina (Brusse) O.Blanco, A.Crespo, Elix, D.Hawksw. & Lumbsch (2004)
- Xanthoparmelia mannumensis (Elix) Elix & J.Johnst. (1986)
- Xanthoparmelia mapholanengensis Hale (1989)
- Xanthoparmelia marcellii T.H.Nash & Elix (1995)
- Xanthoparmelia maricopensis T.H.Nash & Elix (1986)
- Xanthoparmelia maritima (Elix) Elix (2003)
- Xanthoparmelia marroninipuncta (Brusse) Hale (1988)
- Xanthoparmelia martinii (Essl.) O.Blanco, A.Crespo, Elix, D.Hawksw. & Lumbsch (2004)
- Xanthoparmelia masonii Elix (1993) – Australia
- Xanthoparmelia maxima Hale (1989)
- Xanthoparmelia mayrhoferi Elix (1997) – Australia
- Xanthoparmelia mbabanensis Hale (1987)
- Xanthoparmelia melancholica (J.Steiner & Zahlbr.) O.Blanco, A.Crespo, Elix, D.Hawksw. & Lumbsch (2004)
- Xanthoparmelia melanobarbatica (Essl.) O.Blanco, A.Crespo, Elix, D.Hawksw. & Lumbsch (2004)
- Xanthoparmelia meruensis Krog & Swinscow (1987)
- Xanthoparmelia mesmerizans (Brusse) Elix (1997)
- Xanthoparmelia metaclystoides (Kurok. & Filson) Elix & J.Johnst. (1986)
- Xanthoparmelia metamorphosa (Gyeln.) Hale (1974)
- Xanthoparmelia metastrigosa (Elix) Hale (1984)
- Xanthoparmelia mexicana (Gyeln.) Hale (1974)
- Xanthoparmelia microcephala Elix & Kantvilas (1999) – Australia
- Xanthoparmelia microlobulata Hale (1987)
- Xanthoparmelia micromaculata Elix (2002) – Africa
- Xanthoparmelia microphyllizans Elix (2000)
- Xanthoparmelia micropsoromica T.H.Nash & Elix (1995)
- Xanthoparmelia microspora (Müll. Arg.) Hale (1974)
- Xanthoparmelia millerae Elix (1999) – Australia
- Xanthoparmelia minuta M.D.E.Knox & Hale (1986) – Africa
- Xanthoparmelia minutella O.Blanco, A.Crespo, Elix, D.Hawksw. & Lumbsch (2004)
- Xanthoparmelia mobergii T.H.Nash & Elix (1995)
- Xanthoparmelia moctezumensis T.H.Nash (1979)
- Xanthoparmelia mollis Hale (1986) – Africa
- Xanthoparmelia molliuscula (Ach.) Hale (1974)
- Xanthoparmelia monadnockensis Elix (2003) – Australia
- Xanthoparmelia monastica T.H.Nash & Elix (1995)
- Xanthoparmelia mongaensis (Elix) Elix (1984)
- Xanthoparmelia mongolica Kurok. (1989)
- Xanthoparmelia montanensis Hale (1984)
- Xanthoparmelia monticola (J.P.Dey) Hale (1988)
- Xanthoparmelia morrisii Elix & Kantvilas (2009) – Australia
- Xanthoparmelia mougeotii (Schaer. ex D.Dietr.) Hale (1974)
- Xanthoparmelia mougeotina (Nyl.) D.J.Galloway (1981)
- Xanthoparmelia multiacida Elix (1999)
- Xanthoparmelia multipartita (R.Br. ex Cromb.) Hale (1984)
- Xanthoparmelia murina (Kurok.) Elix (2003)
- Xanthoparmelia musculina (Brusse) Elix (1997)
- Xanthoparmelia mutabilis (Taylor) Hale (1990)

== N ==
- Xanthoparmelia nakuruensis (Essl.) O.Blanco, A.Crespo, Elix, D.Hawksw. & Lumbsch (2004)
- Xanthoparmelia namaensis (J.Steiner & Zahlbr.) O.Blanco, A.Crespo, Elix, D.Hawksw. & Lumbsch (2004)
- Xanthoparmelia namakwa Hale (1986) – Africa
- Xanthoparmelia namaquensis Hale (1986) – Africa
- Xanthoparmelia namibiensis (Elix & T.H.Nash) O.Blanco, A.Crespo, Elix, D.Hawksw. & Lumbsch (2004)
- Xanthoparmelia nana (Kurok.) Elix & J.Johnst. (1987) – Australia
- Xanthoparmelia nanoides Elix (2003) – Australia
- Xanthoparmelia nashii Elix & J.Johnst. (1986)
- Xanthoparmelia natalensis Hale (1987) – Africa
- Xanthoparmelia naudesnekia Hale (1987)
- Xanthoparmelia nautilomontana (Brusse) O.Blanco, A.Crespo, Elix, D.Hawksw. & Lumbsch (2004)
- Xanthoparmelia nebulosa (Kurok. & Filson) Elix & J.Johnst. (1986)
- Xanthoparmelia neochlorochroa Hale (1987)
- Xanthoparmelia neocongensis (Hale) Hale (1974)
- Xanthoparmelia neocongruens Hale (1984)
- Xanthoparmelia neoconspersa (Gyeln.) Hale (1988)
- Xanthoparmelia neocumberlandia T.H.Nash & Elix (1995)
- Xanthoparmelia neodelisei (Elix) O.Blanco, A.Crespo, Elix, D.Hawksw. & Lumbsch (2004)
- Xanthoparmelia neoglabrans (Elix) O.Blanco, A.Crespo, Elix, D.Hawksw. & Lumbsch (2004)
- Xanthoparmelia neokalbii T.H.Nash & Elix (1995)
- Xanthoparmelia neomongaensis (Elix & J.Johnst.) Elix (2003)
- Xanthoparmelia neononreagens O.Blanco, A.Crespo, Elix, D.Hawksw. & Lumbsch (2004)
- Xanthoparmelia neopropagulifera (Gyeln.) Hale (1987)
- Xanthoparmelia neopropaguloides Hale (1990)
- Xanthoparmelia neoquintaria (Hale) Elix (2003)
- Xanthoparmelia neoreptans Hale (1987) – Africa
- Xanthoparmelia neorimalis (Elix & P.M.Armstr.) Elix & T.H.Nash (1986)
- Xanthoparmelia neosynestia Hale (1986) – Africa
- Xanthoparmelia neotaractica Hale (1984)
- Xanthoparmelia neotasmanica Hale (1986) – Africa
- Xanthoparmelia neotinctina (Elix) Elix & J.Johnst. (1986)
- Xanthoparmelia neotucsonensis Elix (1999) – Australia
- Xanthoparmelia neotumidosa Hale (1987)
- Xanthoparmelia neoweberi Hale (1987) – Africa
- Xanthoparmelia neowyomingica Hale (1989)
- Xanthoparmelia nepalensis L.R.Sharma & Kurok. (1990)
- Xanthoparmelia nerrigensis Elix (2004)
- Xanthoparmelia nigraoleosa Elix & J.Johnst. (1988)
- Xanthoparmelia nigrocephala Kurok. (1989)
- Xanthoparmelia nigrolavicola T.H.Nash & Elix (2004)
- Xanthoparmelia nigropsoromifera (T.H.Nash) Egan (1976)
- Xanthoparmelia nigroweberi T.H.Nash & Elix (2004)
- Xanthoparmelia nimbicola (Brusse) Elix (2003)
- Xanthoparmelia nimisii Barcenas-Peña, Lumbsch & Grewe (2023) – Southern Africa
- Xanthoparmelia nodulosa Elix (2006) – Australia
- Xanthoparmelia nomosa Elix & Kantvilas (2009) – Australia
- Xanthoparmelia nonreagens Elix & J.Johnst. (1987) – Australia
- Xanthoparmelia norcapnodes (Elix & J.Johnst.) Elix (2003)
- Xanthoparmelia norchlorochroa Hale (1987)
- Xanthoparmelia norcolorata Hale (1989)
- Xanthoparmelia norconvoluta (Elix & P.M.Armstr.) Elix & J.Johnst. (1986)
- Xanthoparmelia norhypopsila Hale (1987)
- Xanthoparmelia norincomposita (Elix & T.H.Nash) O.Blanco, A.Crespo, Elix, D.Hawksw. & Lumbsch (2004)
- Xanthoparmelia norlobaridonica (T.H.Nash & Elix) Elix (2003)
- Xanthoparmelia norlobaronica Hale (1989)
- Xanthoparmelia norpraegnans Elix & J.Johnst. (1988)
- Xanthoparmelia norpumila Elix & J.Johnst. (1986)
- Xanthoparmelia norstrigosa Elix (1996)
- Xanthoparmelia nortegeta Elix (2003) – Australia
- Xanthoparmelia norwalteri Hale (1989)
- Xanthoparmelia notata (Kurok.) Hale (1974)
- Xanthoparmelia notatica Elix & U.Becker (1999)
- Xanthoparmelia novomexicana (Gyeln.) Hale (1974)
- Xanthoparmelia numinbahensis (Elix) Elix (2003)
- Xanthoparmelia nuwarensis Hale (1986) – Africa

== O ==
- Xanthoparmelia oblisata A.Fletcher & Hale (1988)
- Xanthoparmelia obscurata Hale (1987)
- Xanthoparmelia occidentalis (Essl.) O.Blanco, A.Crespo, Elix, D.Hawksw. & Lumbsch (2004)
- Xanthoparmelia ochropulchra Hale (1986) – Africa
- Xanthoparmelia oleosa (Elix & P.M.Armstr.) Elix & T.H.Nash (1986)
- Xanthoparmelia olifantensis Hale (1986) – Africa
- Xanthoparmelia olivetorica Hale (1986) – Africa
- Xanthoparmelia olivetoricella O.Blanco, A.Crespo, Elix, D.Hawksw. & Lumbsch (2004)
- Xanthoparmelia orchardii Elix (1997)
- Xanthoparmelia oreophila (Brusse) Elix (1997)
- Xanthoparmelia oribensis Hale (1986) – Africa
- Xanthoparmelia orientalis Kurok. (1989)
- Xanthoparmelia osorioi T.H.Nash & Elix (1995)
- Xanthoparmelia ovealmbornii A.Thell, Feuerer, Elix & Kärnefelt (2006)
- Xanthoparmelia oveana (Elix) Elix (2003)

== P ==
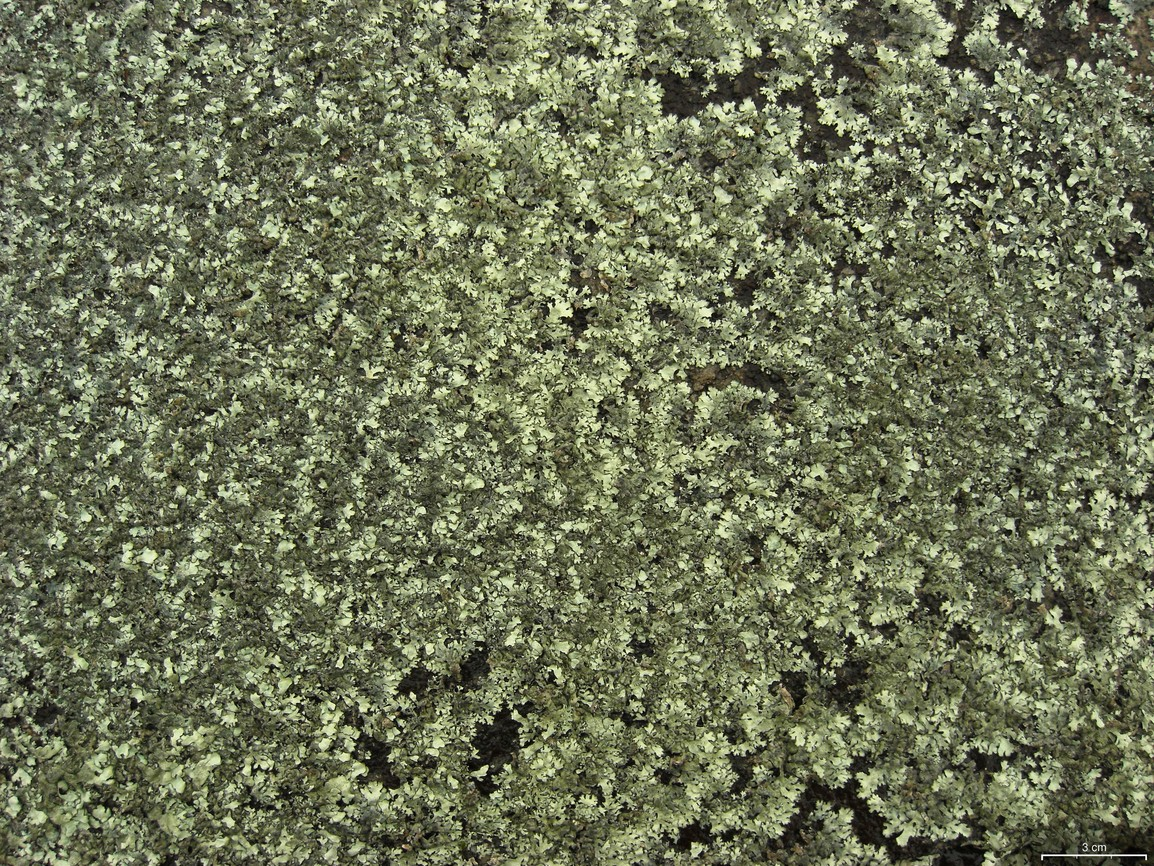
Xanthoparmelia plittii

- Xanthoparmelia pachyclada Hale (1987) – Africa
- Xanthoparmelia pantherina (Kurok.) Elix & J.Johnst. (1987) – Australia
- Xanthoparmelia paradoxa Hale (1987) – Africa
- Xanthoparmelia paraparmeliformis Elix (1999)
- Xanthoparmelia parasitica (Elix) O.Blanco, A.Crespo, Elix, D.Hawksw. & Lumbsch (2004)
- Xanthoparmelia paratasmanica Elix (2004) – Australia
- Xanthoparmelia parviloba (Essl.) O.Blanco, A.Crespo, Elix, D.Hawksw. & Lumbsch (2004)
- Xanthoparmelia parvoclystoides Elix & J.Johnst. (1988)
- Xanthoparmelia parvoincerta Elix & J.Johnst. (1986)
- Xanthoparmelia patagonica (Henssen) Amo, Lumbsch & A.Crespo (2010)
- Xanthoparmelia patula (Brusse) Elix (2002)
- Xanthoparmelia peloloba (Essl.) O.Blanco, A.Crespo, Elix, D.Hawksw. & Lumbsch (2004)
- Xanthoparmelia perezdepazii Pérez-Vargas, Hern.-Padr. & Elix (2007) – Canary Islands
- Xanthoparmelia perfissa (J.Steiner & Zahlbr.) Elix (2003)
- Xanthoparmelia perplexa (Stizenb.) Hale (1990)
- Xanthoparmelia perrugata (Nyl.) O.Blanco, A.Crespo, Elix, D.Hawksw. & Lumbsch (2004)
- Xanthoparmelia perrugosa Hale (1987) – Africa
- Xanthoparmelia pertinax (Kurok. & Filson) Elix & J.Johnst. (1986)
- Xanthoparmelia petriseda (Zahlbr.) O.Blanco, A.Crespo, Elix, D.Hawksw. & Lumbsch (2004)
- Xanthoparmelia phillipsiana (Filson) Elix & J.Johnst. (1986)
- Xanthoparmelia pictada (Essl.) O.Blanco, A.Crespo, Elix, D.Hawksw. & Lumbsch (2004)
- Xanthoparmelia piedmontensis (Hale) Hale (1974)
- Xanthoparmelia pimbaensis Elix (2007)
- Xanthoparmelia pinguiacida (Elix & J.Johnst.) Elix (2003)
- Xanthoparmelia plana (Essl.) O.Blanco, A.Crespo, Elix, D.Hawksw. & Lumbsch (2004)
- Xanthoparmelia planilobata (Gyeln.) Hale (1988)
- Xanthoparmelia plittii (Gyeln.) Hale (1974)
- Xanthoparmelia poeltii (T.H.Nash, Elix & J.Johnst.) Elix (2003)
- Xanthoparmelia pokornyi (Körb.) O.Blanco, A.Crespo, Elix, D.Hawksw. & Lumbsch (2004)
- Xanthoparmelia polystictica (Elix) O.Blanco, A.Crespo, Elix, D.Hawksw. & Lumbsch (2004)
- Xanthoparmelia ponderosa (Brusse) Elix (1997)
- Xanthoparmelia praegnans (Elix & P.M.Armstr.) Elix & J.Johnst. (1986)
- Xanthoparmelia princeps (Brusse) O.Blanco, A.Crespo, Elix, D.Hawksw. & Lumbsch (2004)
- Xanthoparmelia pristiloba (Brusse) Elix (2003)
- Xanthoparmelia probarbellata Hale (1986) – Africa
- Xanthoparmelia prodomokosii Hale, Elix & J.Johnst. (1988)
- Xanthoparmelia prolata (Hale) Elix (2003)
- Xanthoparmelia prolixula (Cromb.) O.Blanco, A.Crespo, Elix, D.Hawksw. & Lumbsch (2004)
- Xanthoparmelia protodysprosa Hale (1987) – Africa
- Xanthoparmelia protolusitana Hale (1989)
- Xanthoparmelia protomatrae (Gyeln.) Hale (1974)
- Xanthoparmelia protoquintaria Hale (1989)
- Xanthoparmelia proximata Hale (1987) – Africa
- Xanthoparmelia pseudepheboides (Essl.) O.Blanco, A.Crespo, Elix, D.Hawksw. & Lumbsch (2004)
- Xanthoparmelia pseudoamphixantha (Elix) Elix & J.Johnst. (1986)
- Xanthoparmelia pseudocafferensis (Essl.) O.Blanco, A.Crespo, Elix, D.Hawksw. & Lumbsch (2004)
- Xanthoparmelia pseudochalybaeizans Barcenas-Peña, Lumbsch & Grewe (2023) – Southern Africa
- Xanthoparmelia pseudocongensis Hale (1987)
- Xanthoparmelia pseudoglabrans (Essl.) O.Blanco, A.Crespo, Elix, D.Hawksw. & Lumbsch (2004)
- Xanthoparmelia pseudohungarica (Gyeln.) Hale (1988)
- Xanthoparmelia pseudohypoleia (Elix) Elix & J.Johnst. (1986)
- Xanthoparmelia pseudoloriloba (Essl.) O.Blanco, A.Crespo, Elix, D.Hawksw. & Lumbsch (2004)
- Xanthoparmelia pseudopulla (Essl.) O.Blanco, A.Crespo, Elix, D.Hawksw. & Lumbsch (2004)
- Xanthoparmelia psornorstictica Hale (1989)
- Xanthoparmelia psoromica Hale (1987)
- Xanthoparmelia psoromifera (Kurok.) Hale (1974)
- Xanthoparmelia pudens (Brusse) Elix (2003)
- Xanthoparmelia pulla (Ach.) O.Blanco, A.Crespo, Elix, D.Hawksw. & Lumbsch (2004)
- Xanthoparmelia pulloides (Essl.) O.Blanco, A.Crespo, Elix, D.Hawksw. & Lumbsch (2004)
- Xanthoparmelia pulvinaria T.H.Nash & Elix (1995)
- Xanthoparmelia pumila (Kurok. & Filson) Elix & J.Johnst. (1986)
- Xanthoparmelia punctulata (Gyeln.) Hale (1988)
- Xanthoparmelia purdieae Elix (1995)
- Xanthoparmelia pustulescens T.H.Nash & Elix (1995)
- Xanthoparmelia pustulifera Hale, T.H.Nash & Elix (1986) – Africa
- Xanthoparmelia pustuliza (Elix) Elix & J.Johnst. (1986)
- Xanthoparmelia pustulosa (Essl.) O.Blanco, A.Crespo, Elix, D.Hawksw. & Lumbsch (2004)
- Xanthoparmelia pustulosorediata Hale (1989)
- Xanthoparmelia putida (Brusse) Elix (1997)
- Xanthoparmelia putsoa Hale (1987)
- Xanthoparmelia pyrenaica (Essl.) O.Blanco, A.Crespo, Elix, D.Hawksw. & Lumbsch (2004)

== Q ==
- Xanthoparmelia quinonella (Elix) O.Blanco, A.Crespo, Elix, D.Hawksw. & Lumbsch (2004)
- Xanthoparmelia quintaria (Hale) Hale (1974)
- Xanthoparmelia quintarioides (Essl.) O.Blanco, A.Crespo, Elix, D.Hawksw. & Lumbsch (2004)

== R ==
- Xanthoparmelia ralla (Brusse) G.Amo, A.Crespo, Elix & Lumbsch (2010)
- Xanthoparmelia ralstoniana (Elix) O.Blanco, A.Crespo, Elix, D.Hawksw. & Lumbsch (2004)
- Xanthoparmelia ramosiae Pérez-Vargas & Blázquez (2024)
- Xanthoparmelia rankinensis Elix (2004) – Australia
- Xanthoparmelia remanella Elix (2004)
- Xanthoparmelia remanens (Elix) Elix & J.Johnst. (1986)
- Xanthoparmelia remnantia (Elix) O.Blanco, A.Crespo, Elix, D.Hawksw. & Lumbsch (2004) – Australia
- Xanthoparmelia reptans (Kurok.) Elix & J.Johnst. (1986)
- Xanthoparmelia rimalis (Kurok.) Elix, A.Thell & Søchting (2009)
- Xanthoparmelia roderickii (Elix & J.Johnst.) Elix (2003)
- Xanthoparmelia rogersii Elix & J.Johnst. (1986)
- Xanthoparmelia rubrireagens (Gyeln.) Hale (1974)
- Xanthoparmelia rubromedulla Hale (1986) – Africa
- Xanthoparmelia rubropustulata Hale (1987) – Africa
- Xanthoparmelia rugulosa Hale (1987)
- Xanthoparmelia rugulosella Elix (2003)
- Xanthoparmelia rupestris Elix & J.Johnst. (1986)
- Xanthoparmelia ryssolea (Ach.) O.Blanco, A.Crespo, Elix, D.Hawksw. & Lumbsch (2004)

== S ==
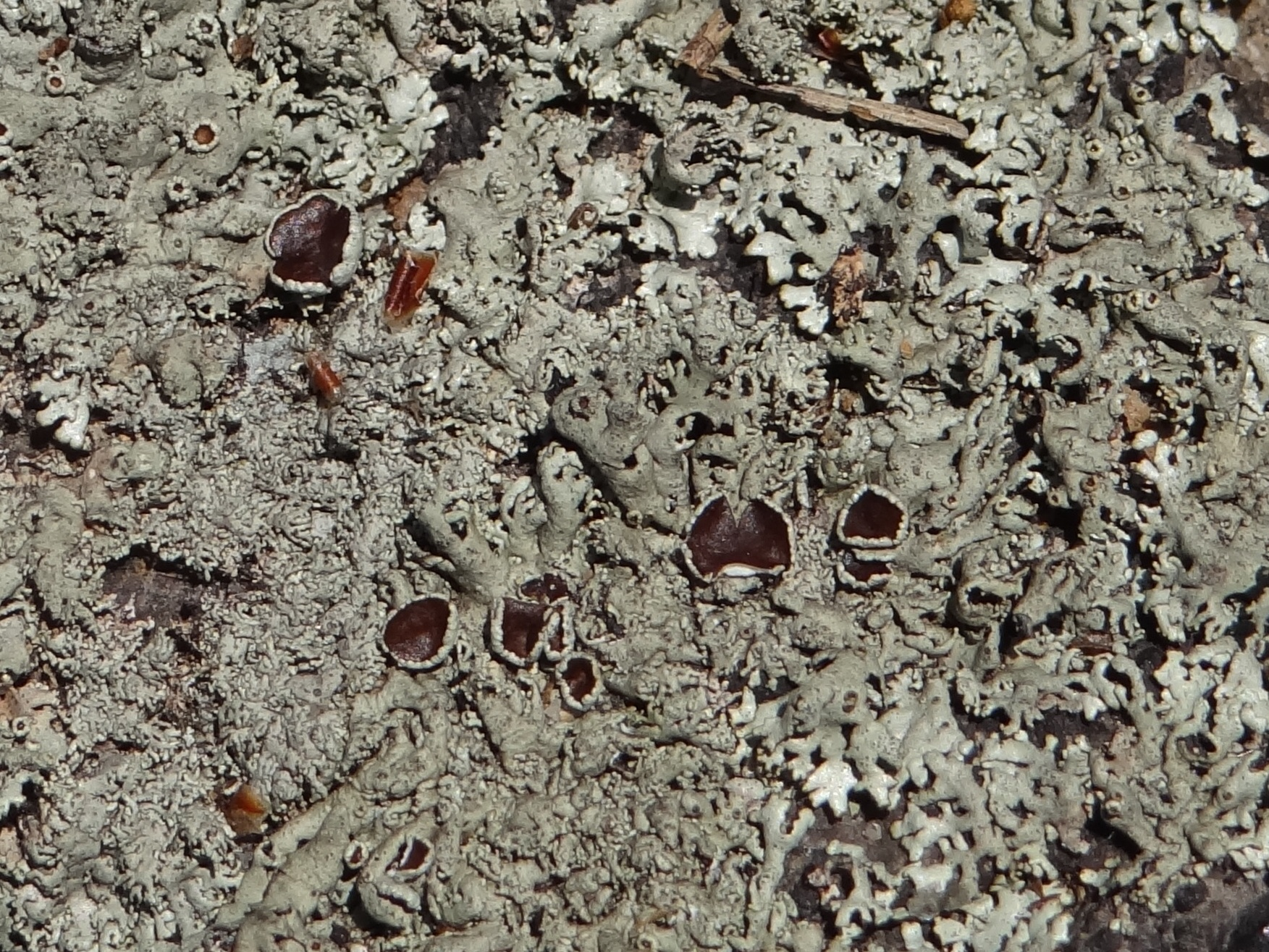
Xanthoparmelia somloensis

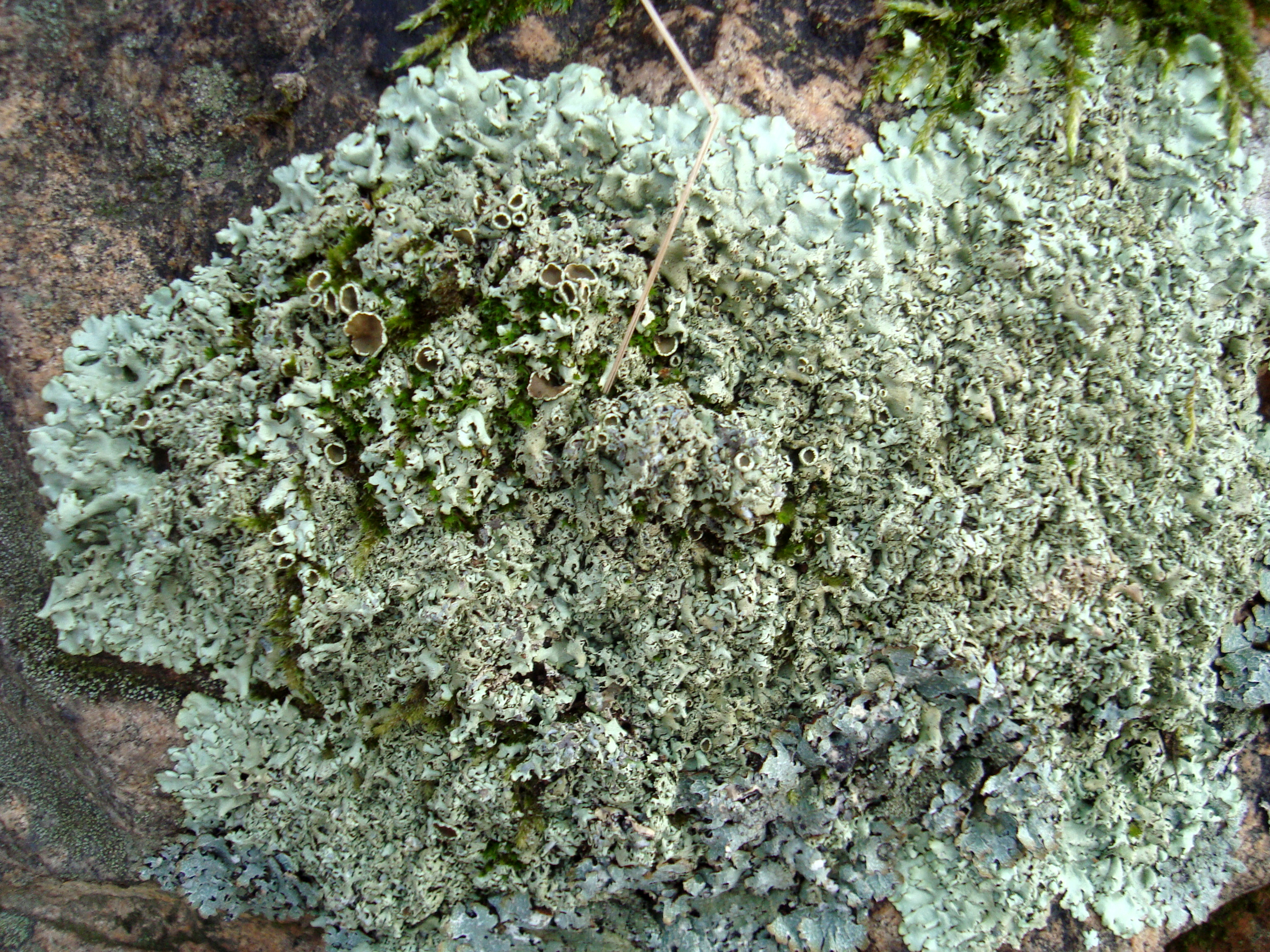
Xanthoparmelia stenophylla

- Xanthoparmelia salamphixantha Hale (1989)
- Xanthoparmelia salazinica (Hale) G.Amo, A.Crespo, Elix & Lumbsch (2010)
- Xanthoparmelia saleruptens Hale (1989)
- Xanthoparmelia salkiboensis Hale (1989)
- Xanthoparmelia sammyi (Elix & J.Johnst.) Elix (2003)
- Xanthoparmelia saniensis Hale (1986) – Africa
- Xanthoparmelia santessonii T.H.Nash & Elix (1995)
- Xanthoparmelia sargentii (Elix & J.Johnst.) Elix (2003)
- Xanthoparmelia scabrella (Essl.) O.Blanco, A.Crespo, Elix, D.Hawksw. & Lumbsch (2004)
- Xanthoparmelia scabrosa (Taylor) Hale (1974)
- Xanthoparmelia scabrosina (Elix) O.Blanco, A.Crespo, Elix, D.Hawksw. & Lumbsch (2004)
- Xanthoparmelia scabrosinita (Essl.) Elix (2003)
- Xanthoparmelia schenckiana (Müll.Arg.) Hale (1974)
- Xanthoparmelia schistacea (Kurok. & Filson) Elix (2003)
- Xanthoparmelia schmidtii Hale (1984)
- Xanthoparmelia scotophylla (Kurok.) Elix (2003)
- Xanthoparmelia scutariae T.H.Nash & Elix (1995)
- Xanthoparmelia seginata (Elix & J.Johnst.) Elix (2003)
- Xanthoparmelia segregata Elix & J.Johnst. (1988)
- Xanthoparmelia semiviridis (F. Muell. ex Nyl.) O.Blanco, A.Crespo, Elix, D.Hawksw. & Lumbsch (2004)
- Xanthoparmelia serpulina (Essl.) O.Blanco, A.Crespo, Elix, D.Hawksw. & Lumbsch (2004)
- Xanthoparmelia serusiauxii Hale (1986) – Africa
- Xanthoparmelia shebaiensis T.H.Nash & Elix (1987)
- Xanthoparmelia sigillata (Brusse) Hale (1990)
- Xanthoparmelia simulans Hale (1986) – Africa
- Xanthoparmelia sipmaniana Barcenas-Peña, Lumbsch & Grewe (2023) – Southern Africa
- Xanthoparmelia sipmanii T.H.Nash & Elix (1995)
- Xanthoparmelia sitiens (Brusse) Elix (2003)
- Xanthoparmelia skottsbergiana T.H.Nash & Elix (1995)
- Xanthoparmelia skyrinifera Hale (1986) – Africa
- Xanthoparmelia sleei Elix (2003) – Australia
- Xanthoparmelia somervilleae Elix & Kantvilas (2009) – Australia
- Xanthoparmelia sorediata (Elix & P.Child) O.Blanco, A.Crespo, Elix, D.Hawksw. & Lumbsch (2004)
- Xanthoparmelia spargenosa Elix & J.Johnst. (1986)
- Xanthoparmelia spargens (Brusse) Hale (1988)
- Xanthoparmelia spesica (Essl.) O.Blanco, A.Crespo, Elix, D.Hawksw. & Lumbsch (2004)
- Xanthoparmelia spodochroa (Kurok. & Filson) Elix (2003)
- Xanthoparmelia springbokensis Hale (1989)
- Xanthoparmelia squamans (Stizenb.) O.Blanco, A.Crespo, Elix, D.Hawksw. & Lumbsch (2004)
- Xanthoparmelia squamariata (Nyl. ex Cromb.) O.Blanco, A.Crespo, Elix, D.Hawksw. & Lumbsch (2004)
- Xanthoparmelia squamariatella (Elix) O.Blanco, A.Crespo, Elix, D.Hawksw. & Lumbsch (2004)
- Xanthoparmelia squamatica Elix & T.H.Nash (1999) – Africa
- Xanthoparmelia standaertii (Gyeln.) Hale (1974)
- Xanthoparmelia stanthorpensis Elix & Kantvilas (1999)
- Xanthoparmelia stenophylla (Ach.) Ahti & D.Hawksw. (2005)
- Xanthoparmelia stenosporonica Hale (1986) – Africa
- Xanthoparmelia streimannii (Elix & P.M.Armstr.) Elix & J.Johnst. (1986)
- Xanthoparmelia stuartensis Elix & J.Johnst. (1987) – Australia
- Xanthoparmelia stuartioides Elix (2004) – Australia
- Xanthoparmelia subalpina (Elix & J.Johnst.) Elix (2003)
- Xanthoparmelia subamplexuloides Hale (1989)
- Xanthoparmelia subbarbatica (Elix) O.Blanco, A.Crespo, Elix, D.Hawksw. & Lumbsch (2004)
- Xanthoparmelia subbullata Hale (1989)
- Xanthoparmelia subcolorata Hale (1986) – Africa
- Xanthoparmelia subconvoluta Hale (1989)
- Xanthoparmelia subcrustacea (Gyeln.) Hale (1984)
- Xanthoparmelia subcrustosa Hale (1986) – Africa
- Xanthoparmelia subcrustulosa (Elix) O.Blanco, A.Crespo, Elix, D.Hawksw. & Lumbsch (2004)
- Xanthoparmelia subcumberlandia Elix & T.H.Nash (2004)
- Xanthoparmelia subdecipiens (Vain. ex Lynge) Hale (1974)
- Xanthoparmelia subdiffluens Hale (1987)
- Xanthoparmelia subdistorta (Kurok.) Hale (1974)
- Xanthoparmelia suberadicata (Abbayes) Hale (1974)
- Xanthoparmelia subflabellata (J.Steiner) Hale (1974)
- Xanthoparmelia subhosseana (Essl.) O.Blanco, A.Crespo, Elix, D.Hawksw. & Lumbsch (2004)
- Xanthoparmelia subimitatrix (Essl.) O.Blanco, A.Crespo, Elix, D.Hawksw. & Lumbsch (2004)
- Xanthoparmelia subincerta (Essl.) O.Blanco, A.Crespo, Elix, D.Hawksw. & Lumbsch (2004)
- Xanthoparmelia sublaevis (Cout.) Hale (1988)
- Xanthoparmelia sublineola (Elix & J.Johnst.) Elix (2003)
- Xanthoparmelia subloxodella (Elix & Kantvilas) O.Blanco, A.Crespo, Elix, D.Hawksw. & Lumbsch (2004)
- Xanthoparmelia subluminosa Hale (1989)
- Xanthoparmelia submougeotii Hale (1989)
- Xanthoparmelia subnigra Hale (1986) – Africa
- Xanthoparmelia subnuda (Kurok.) Hale (1974)
- Xanthoparmelia subochracea Hale (1986) – Africa
- Xanthoparmelia subpallida Hale (1987) – Africa
- Xanthoparmelia subpigmentosa Hale (1984)
- Xanthoparmelia subplittii Hale (1987)
- Xanthoparmelia subpolyphylloides (Gyeln.) Kurok. (1991)
- Xanthoparmelia subprolixa (Nyl. ex Kremp.) O.Blanco, A.Crespo, Elix, D.Hawksw. & Lumbsch (2004)
- Xanthoparmelia subramigera (Gyeln.) Hale (1974)
- Xanthoparmelia subruginosa Hale (1986) – Africa
- Xanthoparmelia subrugulosa (Elix & J.Johnst.) Elix (2003)
- Xanthoparmelia subsorediata Hale (1987)
- Xanthoparmelia subspodochroa (Elix & J.Johnst.) Elix (2003)
- Xanthoparmelia subsquamariata (Elix) O.Blanco, A.Crespo, Elix, D.Hawksw. & Lumbsch (2004)
- Xanthoparmelia subsquamariata (Elix) O.Blanco, A.Crespo, Elix, D.Hawksw. & Lumbsch (2004)
- Xanthoparmelia substrigosa (Hale) Hale (1974)
- Xanthoparmelia substygiodes (Essl.) O.Blanco, A.Crespo, Elix, D.Hawksw. & Lumbsch (2004)
- Xanthoparmelia subtaractica T.H.Nash & Elix (1995)
- Xanthoparmelia subtasmanica Elix & T.H.Nash (2004)
- Xanthoparmelia subtinctina T.H.Nash & Elix (1995)
- Xanthoparmelia subtortula (Hale) Elix (2003)
- Xanthoparmelia subtropica (Elix & J.Johnst.) Elix (2003)
- Xanthoparmelia subulcerosa T.H.Nash & Elix (1995)
- Xanthoparmelia subumbilicata Elix & U.Becker (1999)
- Xanthoparmelia subverrucella (Essl.) O.Blanco, A.Crespo, Elix, D.Hawksw. & Lumbsch (2004)
- Xanthoparmelia subverrucigera O.Blanco, A.Crespo & Elix (2005) – Spain
- Xanthoparmelia subvicariella Elix & Kantvilas (2009) – Australia
- Xanthoparmelia succedans Elix & J.Johnst. (1986)
- Xanthoparmelia sulcifera (Kurok.) Hale (1984)
- Xanthoparmelia supposita (Brusse) O.Blanco, A.Crespo, Elix, D.Hawksw. & Lumbsch (2004)
- Xanthoparmelia surrogata Hale (1986) – Africa
- Xanthoparmelia swartbergensis Hale (1987) – Africa
- Xanthoparmelia synestia (Stirt.) Hale (1974)

== T ==
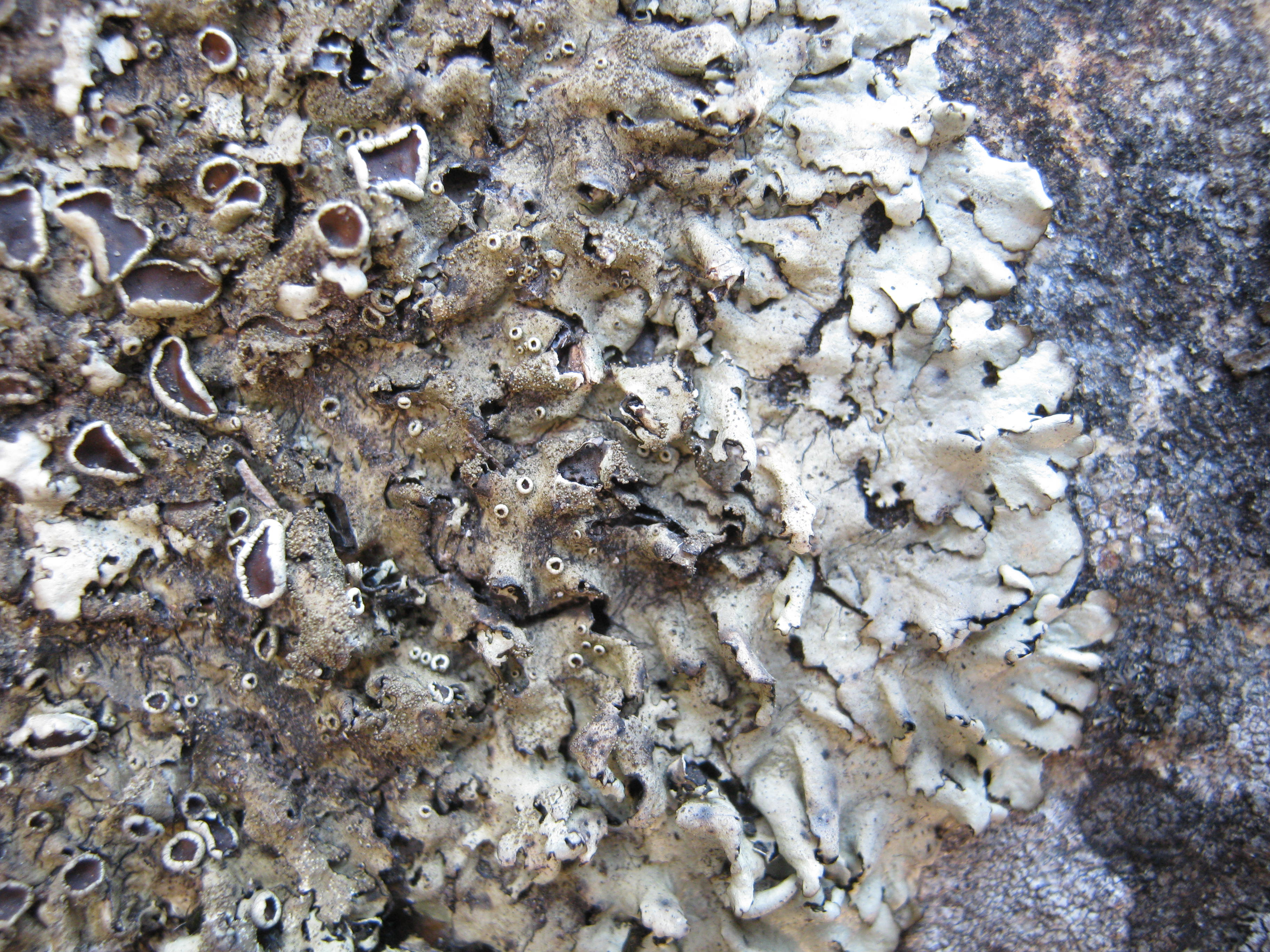
Xanthoparmelia tinctina

- Xanthoparmelia tablensis Hale, T.H.Nash & Elix (1986) – Africa
- Xanthoparmelia taractica (Kremp.) Hale (1974)
- Xanthoparmelia tasmanica (Hook.fil. & Taylor) Hale (1974)
- Xanthoparmelia tatimirix (Essl.) O.Blanco, A.Crespo, Elix, D.Hawksw. & Lumbsch (2004)
- Xanthoparmelia tegeta Elix & J.Johnst. (1986)
- Xanthoparmelia tenacea M.D.E.Knox & Hale (1987)
- Xanthoparmelia tentaculina (Essl.) O.Blanco, A.Crespo, Elix, D.Hawksw. & Lumbsch (2004)
- Xanthoparmelia tenuiloba Hale (1987)
- Xanthoparmelia terrestris (Kurok. & Filson) Elix & J.Johnst. (1986)
- Xanthoparmelia terricola Hale, T.H.Nash & Elix (1986) – Africa
- Xanthoparmelia teydea Pérez-Varg., Hern.-Padr. & Elix (2010) – Canary Islands
- Xanthoparmelia thamnoides (Kurok.) Hale (1974)
- Xanthoparmelia thamnolica Hale (1986) – Africa
- Xanthoparmelia thorstenii (Elix & U.Becker) O.Blanco, A.Crespo, Elix, D.Hawksw. & Lumbsch (2004)
- Xanthoparmelia tibellii T.H.Nash & Elix (2004)
- Xanthoparmelia tinctina (Maheu & A.Gillet) Hale (1974)
- Xanthoparmelia togashii Kurok. (1989)
- Xanthoparmelia tolucensis Hale (1987)
- Xanthoparmelia toninioides Hale (1986) – Africa
- Xanthoparmelia toolbrunupensis Elix (2003) – Australia
- Xanthoparmelia tortula (Kurok.) Elix (2003)
- Xanthoparmelia torulosa (Elix) O.Blanco, A.Crespo, Elix, D.Hawksw. & Lumbsch (2004)
- Xanthoparmelia trachythallina (Essl.) O.Blanco, A.Crespo, Elix, D.Hawksw. & Lumbsch (2004)
- Xanthoparmelia transvaalensis Hale, T.H.Nash & Elix (1986) – Africa
- Xanthoparmelia treurensis Hale, T.H.Nash & Elix (1986) – Africa
- Xanthoparmelia triebeliae Elix (1997) – South Africa
- Xanthoparmelia trirosea Elix (1993) – Australia
- Xanthoparmelia tropica (Elix & J.Johnst.) Elix (2003)
- Xanthoparmelia tsekensis Hale (1989)
- Xanthoparmelia tuberculata (Gyeln.) T.H.Nash & Elix (2004)
- Xanthoparmelia tuberculiformis Kurok. (1989) – Japan
- Xanthoparmelia tuckeriana Elix & T.H.Nash (2004)
- Xanthoparmelia tucsonensis (T.H.Nash) Egan (1975)
- Xanthoparmelia tumidosa Hale (1986) – Africa
- Xanthoparmelia tyrrhea (Brusse) Elix (1997)
- Xanthoparmelia tzaneenensis (Elix) Elix (2003)

== U ==
- Xanthoparmelia ulcerosa (Zahlbr.) Hale (1974)
- Xanthoparmelia umezuana (K.H.Moon & Kashiw.) S.Y.Kondr. (2018)
- Xanthoparmelia umtamvuna Hale (1987) – Africa
- Xanthoparmelia unctula (Brusse) Hale (1988)
- Xanthoparmelia uruguayensis T.H.Nash & Elix (1995)
- Xanthoparmelia usitata (Brusse) Elix (2003)
- Xanthoparmelia ustulata (Kurok. & Filson) Elix & J.Johnst. (1986)

== V ==
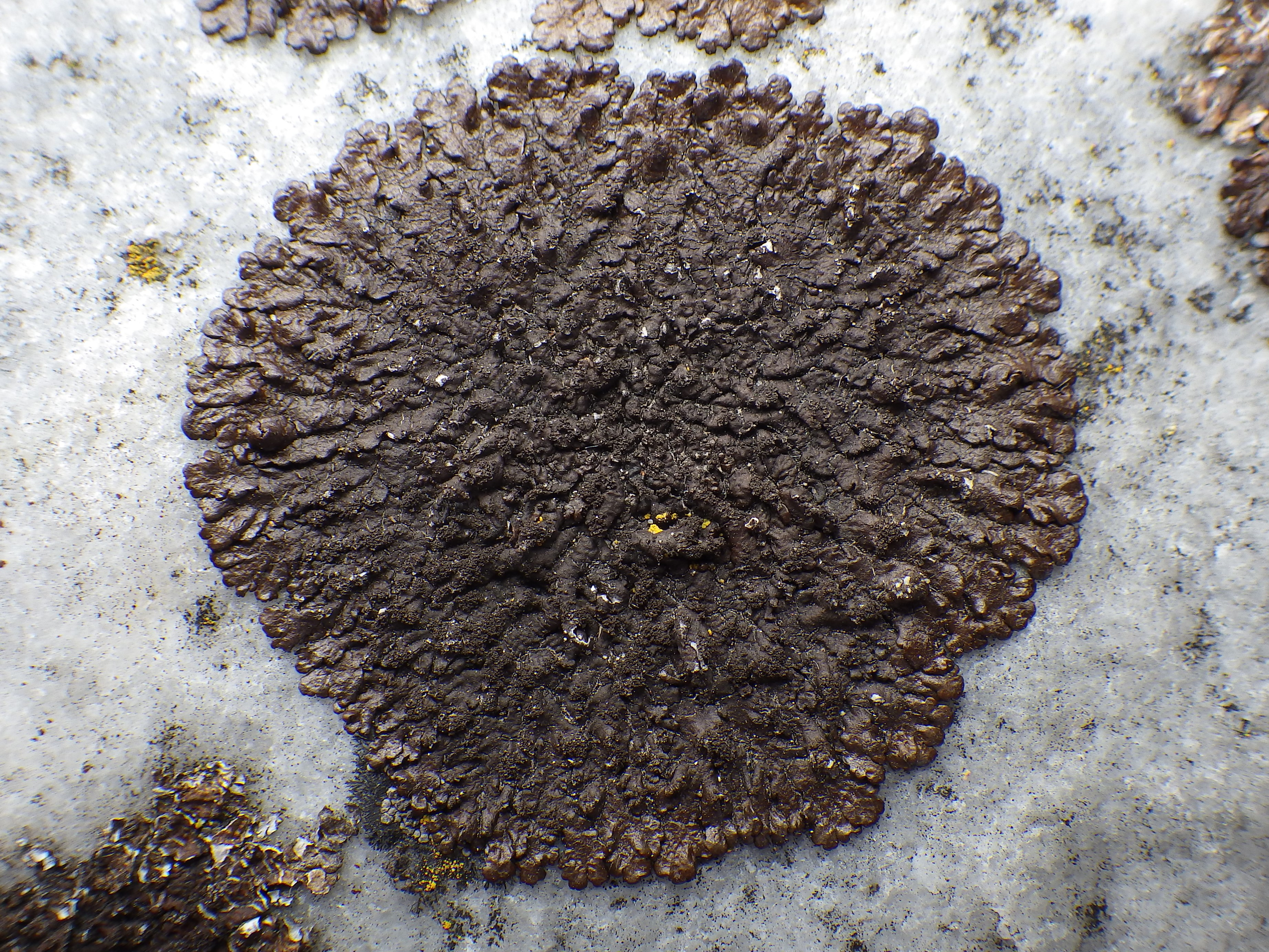
Xanthoparmelia verruculifera

- Xanthoparmelia vagans (Nyl.) Hale (1974)
- Xanthoparmelia valdeta (Elix) Elix (2003)
- Xanthoparmelia vanderbylii (Zahlbr.) Elix (2003)
- Xanthoparmelia vendensis Hale (1987) – Africa
- Xanthoparmelia verdonii Elix & J.Johnst. (1986)
- Xanthoparmelia verecunda (Brusse) Hale (1990)
- Xanthoparmelia verisidiosa (Essl.) O.Blanco, A.Crespo, Elix, D.Hawksw. & Lumbsch (2004)
- Xanthoparmelia verrucella (Essl.) O.Blanco, A.Crespo, Elix, D.Hawksw. & Lumbsch (2004)
- Xanthoparmelia verruciformis Elix & J.Johnst. (1986)
- Xanthoparmelia verrucigera (Nyl.) Hale (1990)
- Xanthoparmelia verruculifera (Nyl.) O.Blanco, A.Crespo, Elix, D.Hawksw. & Lumbsch (2004)
- Xanthoparmelia versicolor (Müll. Arg.) Hale (1974)
- Xanthoparmelia vicaria Elix & J.Johnst. (1986)
- Xanthoparmelia vicariella Elix & Kantvilas (2001) – Tasmania
- Xanthoparmelia vicentei A.Crespo, M.C.Molina & Elix (2001) – Europe
- Xanthoparmelia victoriana Elix & J.Johnst. (1987) – Australia
- Xanthoparmelia villamilianus T.H.Nash, Elix & J.Johnst. (1987)
- Xanthoparmelia violacea (Kurok.) Elix (2003)
- Xanthoparmelia viridis Hale (1986) – Africa
- Xanthoparmelia viriduloumbrina (Gyeln.) Lendemer (2005)
- Xanthoparmelia volcanicola Jayalal, Divakar & Hur (2014) – South Korea

== W ==
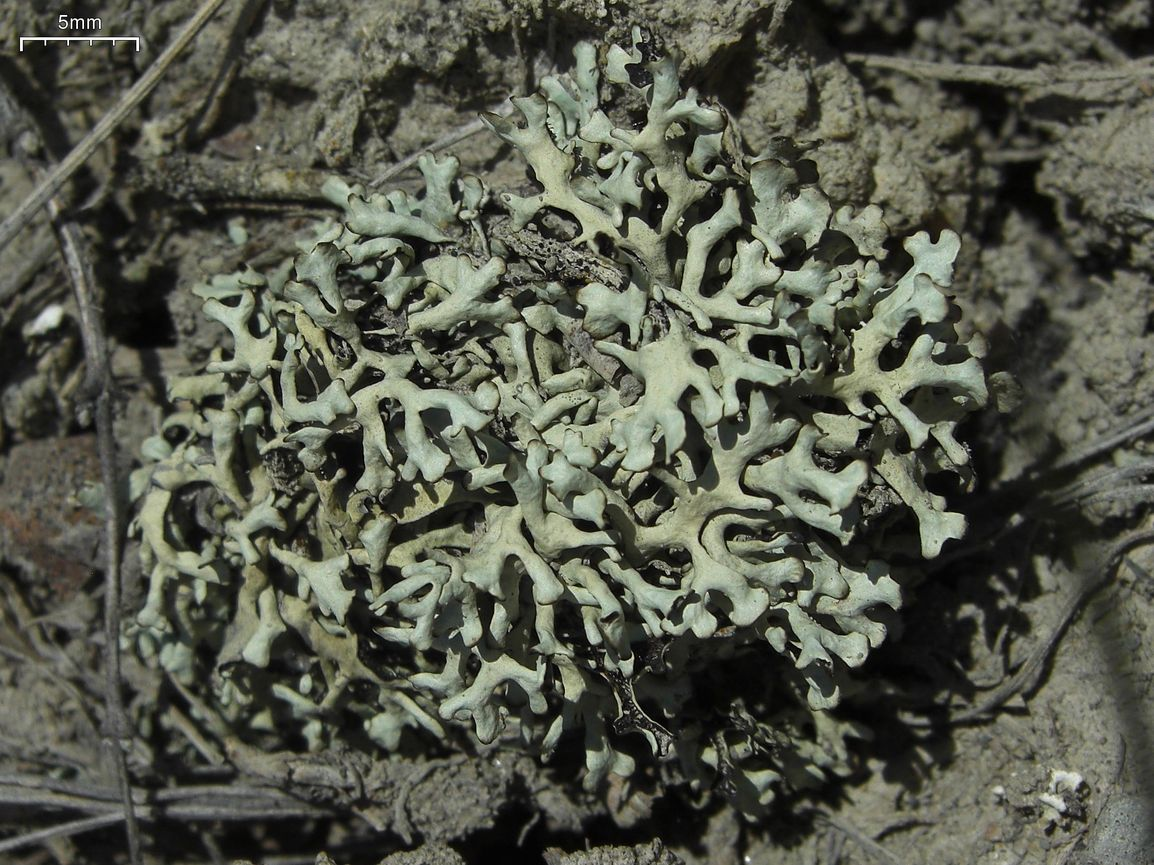
Xanthoparmelia wyomingica

- Xanthoparmelia waboombergensis (Essl.) O.Blanco, A.Crespo, Elix, D.Hawksw. & Lumbsch (2004)
- Xanthoparmelia waboomsbergensis Elix (2002) – Africa
- Xanthoparmelia waiporiensis (Hillmann) O.Blanco, A.Crespo, Elix, D.Hawksw. & Lumbsch (2004)
- Xanthoparmelia walteri M.D.E.Knox (1983) – Africa
- Xanthoparmelia weberi (Hale) Hale (1974)
- Xanthoparmelia weberiella Elix (1999) – Australia
- Xanthoparmelia wesselsii Hale (1986) – Africa
- Xanthoparmelia wildeae (C.W.Dodge) Hale (1974)
- Xanthoparmelia willisii (Kurok. & Filson) Elix & J.Johnst. (1986)
- Xanthoparmelia wirthii (Elix) Elix (2003)
- Xanthoparmelia wisangerensis Elix & J.Johnst. (1987) – Australia
- Xanthoparmelia worcesteri (J.Steiner & Zahlbr.) Hale (1974)
- Xanthoparmelia wrightiana T.H.Nash, Elix & J.Johnst. (1987) – South America
- Xanthoparmelia wyomingica (Gyeln.) Hale (1974)

== X ==
- Xanthoparmelia xanthofarinosa Elix (1993) – Australia
- Xanthoparmelia xanthomelaena (Müll.Arg.) Hale (1987)
- Xanthoparmelia xanthomelanella Elix (2003)
- Xanthoparmelia xanthomelanoides Elix & J.Johnst. (1988)
- Xanthoparmelia xavieri T.H.Nash & Elix (1995)
- Xanthoparmelia xerica (Elix) Elix (2003)
- Xanthoparmelia xerophila Elix & J.Johnst. (1986)
- Xanthoparmelia xizangensis (J.C.Wei) Hale (1988)

== Y ==
- Xanthoparmelia yamblaensis (Elix) Elix (2003)
- Xanthoparmelia yowaensis Elix & J.Johnst. (1987) – Australia

== Z ==
- Xanthoparmelia zimbabwana Elix & U.Becker (1999)
- Xanthoparmelia zonata Elix & J.Johnst. (1987) – Australia
