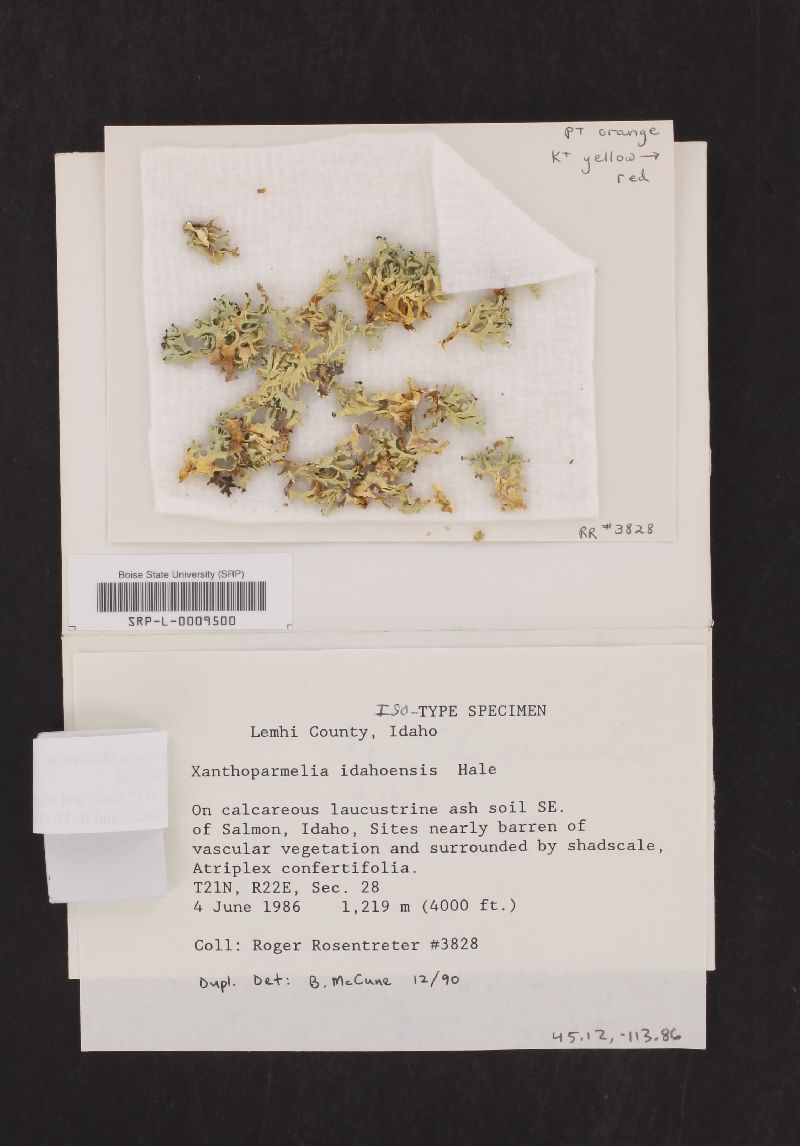

Conservation status
- Imperiled (NatureServe)

Scientific classification
- Kingdom: Fungi
- Division: Ascomycota
- Class: Lecanoromycetes
- Order: Lecanorales
- Family: Parmeliaceae
- Genus: Xanthoparmelia
- Species: X. idahoensis

Binomial name
- Xanthoparmelia idahoensis Hale (1989)

= Xanthoparmelia idahoensis =

Species of lichen found in the USA

Xanthoparmelia idahoensis is a lichen which belongs to the Xanthoparmelia genus. The lichen is uncommon and is listed as endangered by the Nature Conservatory.

== Description ==
X. idahoensis grows in bunches and is found on soil. Its lobes are firm but can break apart when collected. Samples collected have been 2–4 cm in diameter with broad yellowish green lobes which are approximately 1.5-4 mm wide and are contorted or twisted. It has very spare simple rhizines on the underside that are 0.2-0.3mm long.

== Habitat and range ==
X. idahoensis is found in the North American southwest including the US states of Idaho, Colorado, and Wyoming and the Canadian province of Saskatchewan.

== See also ==
- List of Xanthoparmelia species
