= Xanthoparmelia lividica =

Scientific classification
- Kingdom: Fungi
- Division: Ascomycota
- Class: Lecanoromycetes
- Order: Lecanorales
- Family: Parmeliaceae
- Genus: Xanthoparmelia
- Species: X. lividica

Binomial name
- Xanthoparmelia lividica Hale (1986)

Species of lichen-forming fungus

Xanthoparmelia lividica is a species of saxicolous (rock-dwelling), foliose lichen in the family Parmeliaceae. Found in Southern Africa, it was formally described as a new species in 1986 by the American lichenologist Mason Hale. The type specimen was collected from the Table Mountain sandstone ledges in Fynbos vegetation, in the Cape of Good Hope Nature Reserve in Cape Province.

== Description ==
The lichen, which is very tightly attached to its rock substrate, is yellow-green at its margins but darkens to nearly black in the center, and measures 2–4 cm (0.8–1.6 in) in diameter. Hale describes it as a "tiny lichen ... barely discernible on the surface of coarse sandstone ledges", and suggests that its lobes, which are 0.1–0.2 mm wide, are perhaps the smallest of the many Xanthoparmelia species.

It contains three secondary metabolites (lichen products): lividic acid (for which it is named), colensoid acid, and usnic acid.

== See also ==
- List of Xanthoparmelia species
