= Xanthoparmelia africana =

Scientific classification
- Domain: Eukaryota
- Kingdom: Fungi
- Division: Ascomycota
- Class: Lecanoromycetes
- Order: Lecanorales
- Family: Parmeliaceae
- Genus: Xanthoparmelia
- Species: X. africana

Binomial name
- Xanthoparmelia africana Hale (1986)

Species of lichen

Xanthoparmelia africana is a species of saxicolous (rock-dwelling), foliose lichen in the family Parmeliaceae. It is found in Southern Africa.

== Taxonomy ==
Xanthoparmelia africana was formally described as a new species in 1986 by the American lichenologist Mason Hale. The type specimen was collected from Sitimon Track on Mount Kenya, at an elevation of 3,300 to 3,400 m (10,800 to 11,200 ft). It occurs at higher elevations in mountains of Kenya and Uganda, and at elevation between 700 and 800 m (2,300 and 2,600 ft) in Cape Province, South Africa.

== Description ==
Xanthoparmelia africana is a foliose (leaf-like) lichen that grows loosely attached to rock surfaces. The lichen forms distinctive cushion-like colonies that can spread 10–20 cm across and reach several cm in thickness. Its body (thallus) is firm and has a bright yellowish-green colouration. The lichen's lobes are somewhat linear in shape, measuring 2–4 mm in width. These lobes branch into two directions (dichotomously) and grow in a crowded, overlapping pattern. The upper surface develops a shiny appearance and, as the lichen ages, becomes marked with subtle to noticeable white spots (maculations). The species lacks both isidia and soredia, which are common reproductive structures in other lichens.

Beneath its upper surface, X. africana has a white middle layer (medulla). The lower surface is flat and features a black central region that transitions to brown at the margins. This underside is covered with dense, root-like structures called rhizines, which start brown but darken to black as they mature. These rhizines can be either simple or forked and range from 0.5 to 1.5 mm in length.

The species produces well-developed reproductive structures. Its pycnidia (asexual reproductive organs) release two-pointed conidia measuring 0.5 by 6–8 μm. The sexual reproductive structures (apothecia) are slightly stalked, measure 5–10 mm in diameter, and produce ascospores measuring 6–7 by 9–12 μm. The outer layer (cortex) of this lichen contains a secondary metabolite called usnic acid.

== Habitat and distribution ==
Xanthoparmelia africana is native to East Africa, with confirmed populations in Kenya and Uganda. The species shows a distinct preference for high-altitude environments, typically occurring at elevations above 3,000 m. In these mountainous regions, it forms thick, cushion-like mats on rock surfaces.

While the species shares some characteristics with its relatives, its habitat preferences help distinguish it from similar taxa. For instance, the closely related Xanthoparmelia tasmanica, which is widely distributed across Australasia, southern Africa, and the Americas, occupies different ecological niches. Another related species, X. neotasmanica, is found in southern Africa but inhabits lower elevations below 2,000 meters.

== See also ==
- List of Xanthoparmelia species
