= Xanthoparmelia callifolioides =

Scientific classification
- Kingdom: Fungi
- Division: Ascomycota
- Class: Lecanoromycetes
- Order: Lecanorales
- Family: Parmeliaceae
- Genus: Xanthoparmelia
- Species: X. callifolioides

Binomial name
- Xanthoparmelia callifolioides Adler, Elix & J.Johnst. (1988)

Species of lichen found in the southern hemisphere

Xanthoparmelia callifolioides is a foliose lichen that belongs to the genus Xanthoparmelia.

== Description ==
Xanthoparmelia callifolioides grows to around 5–10 cm in diameter with broad light green lobes that are 1.5-3mm wide. It grows on small stones, pebbles, and nearby soil. Its back side contains moderate collections of patchy simple rhizines that are approximately 1–2 mm long. A close relative is the lichen Xanthoparmelia taractica.

== Habitat and range ==
Xanthoparmelia callifolioides is found mostly in the southern hemisphere, including Argentina, Australia, Bolivia, and Chile.

== Chemistry ==
Xanthoparmelia callifolioides is known to contain usnic acid.

== See also ==
- List of Xanthoparmelia species
