= Xanthoparmelia capnoexillima =

Scientific classification
- Kingdom: Fungi
- Division: Ascomycota
- Class: Lecanoromycetes
- Order: Lecanorales
- Family: Parmeliaceae
- Genus: Xanthoparmelia
- Species: X. capnoexillima

Binomial name
- Xanthoparmelia capnoexillima Elix (2006)
- Flinders Ranges, South Australia

Species of foliose lichen

Xanthoparmelia capnoexillima is a species of saxicolous (rock-dwelling) foliose lichen in the family Parmeliaceae. It occurs in South Australia.

== Taxonomy ==
Xanthoparmelia capnoexillima was described by John Elix. The species epithet, capnoexillima, is derived from the Latin capnoides, meaning 'smoky' or 'sooty', referring to the grey appearance of the thallus, and exillima, indicating its close resemblance to Xanthoparmelia exillima. The type specimen was collected in the Flinders Ranges, South Australia.

== Description ==
The thallus of Xanthoparmelia capnoexillima is somewhat crustose and very tightly attached (adnate, ranging up to 5 cm in width. Lobes are contiguous, barely imbricate (overlapping), somewhat linear, and irregularly branched, measuring 0.2–0.8 mm in width with incised (notched) tips. The upper surface is grey, turning darker with age, initially smooth and shiny but becoming rugulose and areolate in the thallus centre. It lacks soredia and isidia, but has more or less spherical (globose) to cylindrical isidia that are blackened at the tips.

The medulla is white, and the lower surface is smooth, ranging from ivory to pale brown, and darker at the apices. Rhizines are sparse to moderate, simple, and the same colour as the thallus, measuring 0.1–0.3 mm long.

Chemical spot tests on the cortex yield a K+ (yellow) reaction; the medulla tests K−, C−, KC+ (rose), and P−. It contains atranorin as a major secondary metabolite, along with norlobaridone and subnorlobaridone in trace amounts.

== Habitat and distribution ==
Xanthoparmelia capnoexillima is found on sandstone rocks within sparse woodlands, characterized by its presence in the Flinders Ranges of South Australia. Its habitat includes areas with a mix of Callitris and Eucalyptus, indicative of its preference for semi-arid regions.

== See also ==
- List of Xanthoparmelia species
