= Xanthoparmelia monadnockensis =

Scientific classification
- Kingdom: Fungi
- Division: Ascomycota
- Class: Lecanoromycetes
- Order: Lecanorales
- Family: Parmeliaceae
- Genus: Xanthoparmelia
- Species: X. monadnockensis

Binomial name
- Xanthoparmelia monadnockensis Elix (2003)
- Holotype: Monadnocks Nature Reserve, Western Australia

Species of foliose lichen

Xanthoparmelia monadnockensis is a species of foliose lichen in the family Parmeliaceae, described by John Elix in 2003. It is native to Western Australia, particularly found in the Monadnocks Nature Reserve near Jarrahdale.

== Taxonomy ==
Xanthoparmelia monadnockensis is part of the genus Xanthoparmelia, known for its diverse species of foliose (leafy) lichens. This species was identified as distinct due to its unique morphological features and chemical makeup, differing significantly from similar species such as Xanthoparmelia centralis.

== Description ==
The thallus of Xanthoparmelia monadnockensis is small-foliose, loosely attached to the substrate, and can grow up to 6 cm (2 in) wide. The lobes are flat, more or less linear, and range from 0.5 to 1.2 mm wide, featuring more or less dichotomous to irregular branching. The upper surface is initially yellow-green but quickly darkens, becoming shiny at the tips and developing cracks that lead to an areolate centre. The lichen is characterised by dense, cylindrical isidia that become richly branched in a coral-like pattern and have dark, fragile tips.

The lower surface is pale brown and flat, with sparse, robust, brown rhizines. No reproductive structures such as apothecia (fruiting bodies) or pycnidia (asexual reproductive structures containing conidia) have been observed to occur in this species.

Chemical spot testing of the lichen shows no reaction to potassium hydroxide (K−) on the cortex or medulla, but is KC+ (yellow-orange) on the medulla. It contains significant amounts of usnic acid and barbaric acid, with minor amounts of 4-O-demethylbarbatic acid, which help define its distinct chemical profile.

== Habitat and distribution ==
Xanthoparmelia monadnockensis is specifically found in the Monadnocks Nature Reserve and other granite monadnock regions of southwestern Western Australia, growing on sun-exposed granite rocks within dry Eucalyptus woodlands.

== See also ==
- List of Xanthoparmelia species
