= Xanthoparmelia karooensis =

Scientific classification
- Kingdom: Fungi
- Division: Ascomycota
- Class: Lecanoromycetes
- Order: Lecanorales
- Family: Parmeliaceae
- Genus: Xanthoparmelia
- Species: X. karooensis

Binomial name
- Xanthoparmelia karooensis Hale (1986)

Species of lichen-forming fungus

Xanthoparmelia karooensis is a species of saxicolous (rock-dwelling), foliose lichen in the family Parmeliaceae. Found in Southern Africa, it was formally described as a new species in 1986 by the American lichenologist Mason Hale. The type specimen was collected from Cape Province at an elevation of 700 m (2,300 ft), where it was found growing on a vertical schist outcrop. It contains hypoprotocetraric acid, 4-O-demethylnotatic acid, usnic acid, and several minor unidentified secondary metabolites.

== See also ==
- List of Xanthoparmelia species
