= Xanthoparmelia klauskalbii =

Scientific classification
- Domain: Eukaryota
- Kingdom: Fungi
- Division: Ascomycota
- Class: Lecanoromycetes
- Order: Lecanorales
- Family: Parmeliaceae
- Genus: Xanthoparmelia
- Species: X. klauskalbii

Binomial name
- Xanthoparmelia klauskalbii Elix (2007)

Species of lichen

Xanthoparmelia klauskalbii is a species of foliose lichen in the family Parmeliaceae. Found in Australia, it was described as a new species in 2007 by John Alan Elix. It grows on weathered volcanic rocks. The specific epithet honours German lichenologist Klaus Kalb.

== See also ==
- List of Xanthoparmelia species
