= Xanthoparmelia denudata =

Scientific classification
- Kingdom: Fungi
- Division: Ascomycota
- Class: Lecanoromycetes
- Order: Lecanorales
- Family: Parmeliaceae
- Genus: Xanthoparmelia
- Species: X. denudata

Binomial name
- Xanthoparmelia denudata Hale (1986)

Species of lichen-forming fungus

Xanthoparmelia denudata is a species of saxicolous (rock-dwelling), foliose lichen in the family Parmeliaceae. Found in Southern Africa, it was formally described as a new species in 1986 by the American lichenologist Mason Hale. The type specimen was collected in Cape Province, at an elevation of about 500 m (1,600 ft); there, it was found in a pasture growing on large exposed sandstone ledges. The dark yellowish-green thallus of the lichen reaches 5–8 cm (2–3 in) in diameter, although neighbouring thalli can coalesce to form larger units up to 15 cm (6 in). The lobes comprising the thallus are more or less linear in form, and measure 0.6–1.3 mm wide. Three secondary metabolites (lichen products) have been found in Xanthoparmelia denudata: salazinic acid, usnic acid, and skyrin.

== See also ==
- List of Xanthoparmelia species
