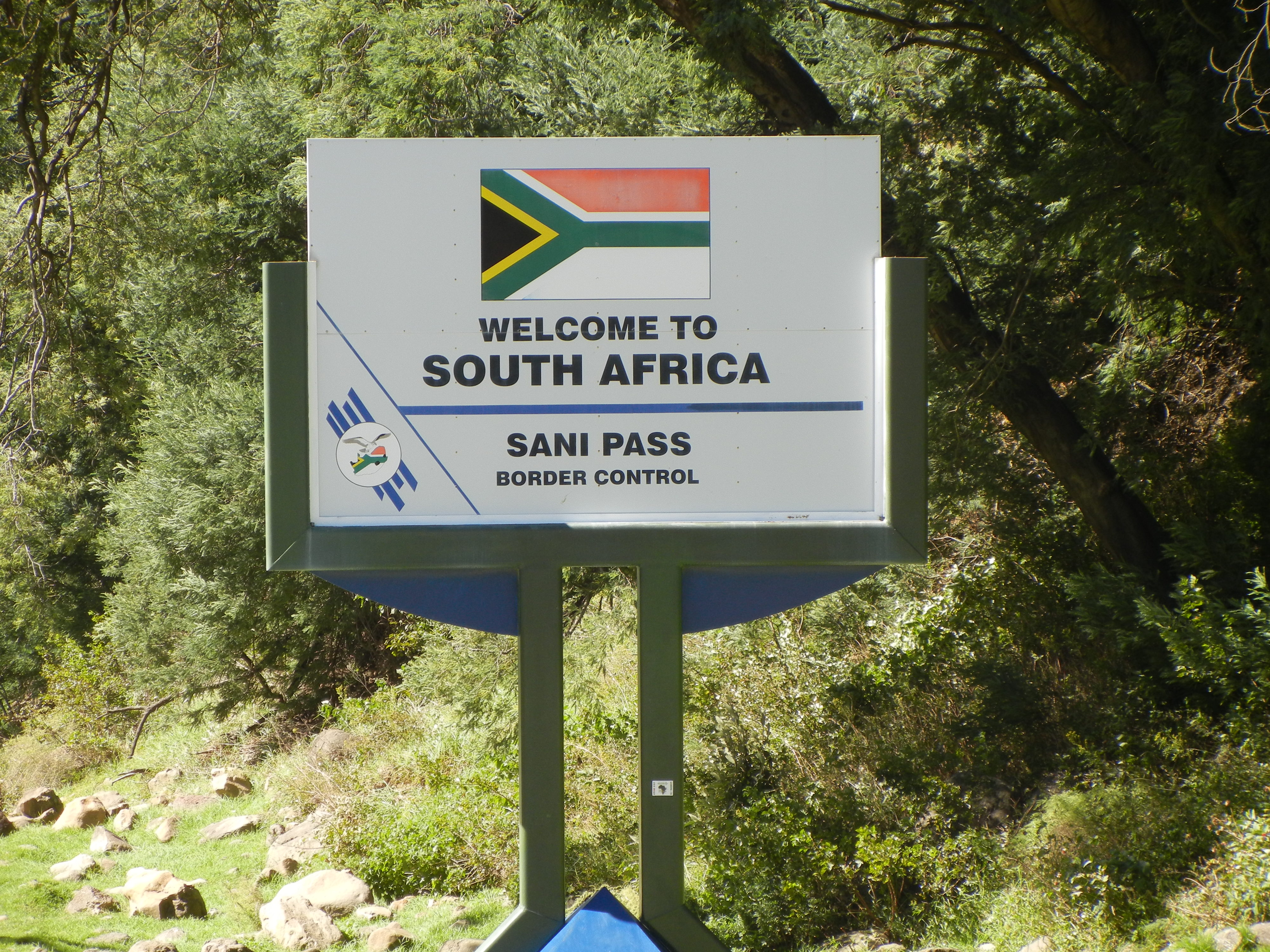
- General habitat of type specimen

Scientific classification
- Kingdom: Fungi
- Division: Ascomycota
- Class: Lecanoromycetes
- Order: Lecanorales
- Family: Parmeliaceae
- Genus: Xanthoparmelia
- Species: X. saniensis

Binomial name
- Xanthoparmelia saniensis Hale (1986)

= Xanthoparmelia saniensis =

Species of lichen

Xanthoparmelia saniensis is a high-elevation species of saxicolous (rock-dwelling), foliose lichen in the family Parmeliaceae. Found in Southern Africa, it was formally described as a new species in 1986 by the American lichenologist Mason Hale. The type specimen was collected from Sani Pass, east of Customs Gate (Lesotho) at an elevation of 2,875 m (9,432 ft), where it was found growing on exposed dolerite ledges. The lichen thallus, which is tightly attached to its rock substrate, is yellowish green in colour and measures 4–6 cm (1.6–2.4 in) broad. It has dense, globose (roughly spherical) isidia that are constricted at the burst, and burst open at the tip.

== See also ==
- List of Xanthoparmelia species
