= Xanthoparmelia subvicariella =

Scientific classification
- Kingdom: Fungi
- Division: Ascomycota
- Class: Lecanoromycetes
- Order: Lecanorales
- Family: Parmeliaceae
- Genus: Xanthoparmelia
- Species: X. subvicariella

Binomial name
- Xanthoparmelia subvicariella Elix & Kantvilas (2009)
- Holotype site: intersection of Elderslie Road and Black Brush Road, Tasmania

Species of lichen

Xanthoparmelia subvicariella is a species of saxicolous (rock-dwelling), foliose lichen in the family Parmeliaceae. Found in Tasmania, Australia, it was formally described by lichenologist John Alan Elix and Gintaras Kantvilas in 2009. The species epithet refers to the similarity this species has with Xanthoparmelia vicariella.

== See also ==
- List of Xanthoparmelia species
