= Xanthoparmelia dubitella =

Scientific classification
- Domain: Eukaryota
- Kingdom: Fungi
- Division: Ascomycota
- Class: Lecanoromycetes
- Order: Lecanorales
- Family: Parmeliaceae
- Genus: Xanthoparmelia
- Species: X. dubitella

Binomial name
- Xanthoparmelia dubitella Elix (2002)

Species of lichen

Xanthoparmelia dubitella is a species of saxicolous (rock-dwelling) lichen in the family Parmeliaceae. Found in South Africa, it was formally described as a new species in 2002 by Australian lichenologist John Elix. The type specimen was collected from the Cape of Good Hope Nature Reserve (Cape Province), where it was found growing as small, somewhat crustose rosettes on rocks and boulders. It is only known from the type collection. The lichen contains norlobaridone as a major product, minor amounts of usnic acid and connorlobaridone, and trace amounts of loxodin. The species epithet refers to its resemblance to Xanthoparmelia dubitata, which is distinguished by its larger thalli, broader lobes, and a lower surface that is pale tan to brown in colour.

== See also ==
- List of Xanthoparmelia species
