= Xanthoparmelia ewersii =

Scientific classification
- Kingdom: Fungi
- Division: Ascomycota
- Class: Lecanoromycetes
- Order: Lecanorales
- Family: Parmeliaceae
- Genus: Xanthoparmelia
- Species: X. ewersii

Binomial name
- Xanthoparmelia ewersii Elix (2006)
- north Flinders Ranges, South Australia

Species of lichen

Xanthoparmelia ewersii is a little-known species of saxicolous (rock-dwelling) foliose lichen in the family Parmeliaceae. It occurs in South Australia.

== Taxonomy ==
Xanthoparmelia ewersii was first described by the lichenologist John A. Elix in 2006, from collections he made in the north Flinders Ranges. The species is named in honour of the Australian biologist, lichen collector, and Elix's friend, the late William Hector Ewers. This species is closely related to Xanthoparmelia blackdownensis but can be distinguished by its unique characteristics and chemistry.

== Description ==
The thallus of Xanthoparmelia ewersii is foliose (leafy), adnate to tightly adnate, and grows up to 8 cm wide. Lobes are contiguous to imbricate (overlapping), somewhat irregular in shape, and irregularly branched, ranging from 1.5 to 5 mm wide. The upper thallus surface is yellow-green, becoming dull and rugulose (wrinkled) with age, featuring dense, spherical isidia that are sparingly branched. The medulla is white, while the lower surface ranges from ivory to pale brown, with sparse, simple rhizines. Chemically, the medulla contains diffractaic acid as a major secondary metabolite, a rare trait in Xanthoparmelia.

== Habitat and distribution ==
At the time of its original publication, Xanthoparmelia ewersii was known to occur only in its type locality in north Flinders Ranges, South Australia. It grows on slate rocks within Eucalyptus, Melaleuca, and Acacia woodland ecosystems.

== See also ==
- List of Xanthoparmelia species
