= Xanthoparmelia competita =

Scientific classification
- Kingdom: Fungi
- Division: Ascomycota
- Class: Lecanoromycetes
- Order: Lecanorales
- Family: Parmeliaceae
- Genus: Xanthoparmelia
- Species: X. competita

Binomial name
- Xanthoparmelia competita Hale (1986)

Species of lichen-forming fungus

Xanthoparmelia competita is a species of saxicolous (rock-dwelling), foliose lichen in the family Parmeliaceae. Found in Southern Africa, it was formally described as a new species in 1986 by the American lichenologist Mason Hale. The type specimen was collected in Cape Province at an elevation of about 500 m (1,600 ft), where it was growing on domes of coarse conglomerate in Fynbos. The lichen has a dull yellowish-green thallus that grows to 3–6 cm (1.2–2.4 in) in diameter, comprising somewhat irregular lobes that measure 0.7–1.5 mm wide.

== See also ==
- List of Xanthoparmelia species
