= Xanthoparmelia knudsenii =

Scientific classification
- Domain: Eukaryota
- Kingdom: Fungi
- Division: Ascomycota
- Class: Lecanoromycetes
- Order: Lecanorales
- Family: Parmeliaceae
- Genus: Xanthoparmelia
- Species: X. knudsenii

Binomial name
- Xanthoparmelia knudsenii Elix, A.Thell & Søchting (2009)

Species of lichen

Xanthoparmelia knudsenii is a species of saxicolous (rock-dwelling), foliose lichen in the family Parmeliaceae. Found in the United States, it was formally described as a new species in 2009 by the lichenologists Arne Thell, John Alan Elix and Ulrik Søchting. The type specimen was collected from Mohave County, Arizona in May 2003. The species epithet honors American lichenologist Kerry Knudsen. The distribution of this species includes southwestern North America, extending south to central Mexico. It grows on acidic rocks in semi-open woodlands.

== See also ==
- List of Xanthoparmelia species
