= Xanthoparmelia montanensis =

Conservation status
- Secure (NatureServe)

Scientific classification
- Kingdom: Fungi
- Division: Ascomycota
- Class: Lecanoromycetes
- Order: Lecanorales
- Family: Parmeliaceae
- Genus: Xanthoparmelia
- Species: X. montanensis

Binomial name
- Xanthoparmelia montanensis Hale (1984)

Species of lichen found in the USA

Xanthoparmelia montanensis, also known as the Montana rock-shield lichen, belongs to the Xanthoparmelia genus.

== Description ==
This lichen grows to around 3–6 cm in diameter, with lobes which are approximately 0.7–1.5 mm wide with short crowded edges. The upper surface of the lichen is shiny and dark yellowish green. Rhizines are simple in structure, pale, and 0.2–0.5 mm long.

This is the only member of the Xanthoparmelia genus that produces fatty acids which form spots that can be detected with shortwave UV light.

== Habitat and range ==
This lichen is found in Western North America, including the states of Arizona, New Mexico, and Montana.

== See also ==
- List of Xanthoparmelia species
