= Xanthoparmelia biloelensis =

Scientific classification
- Kingdom: Fungi
- Division: Ascomycota
- Class: Lecanoromycetes
- Order: Lecanorales
- Family: Parmeliaceae
- Genus: Xanthoparmelia
- Species: X. biloelensis

Binomial name
- Xanthoparmelia biloelensis Elix (2004)
- Holotype: Bells Creek, Queensland, Australia

Species of lichen

Xanthoparmelia biloelensis is a rare species of saxicolous (rock-dwelling) foliose lichen in the family Parmeliaceae. Described as a new species in 2004, it is known to occur only in its type locality near Biloela in Queensland, Australia.

== Taxonomy ==
It was described as a new species by the lichenologist John A. Elix in 2004. The type specimen was collected at Bells Creek, along Inverness Road, 27 km ENE of Biloela, Queensland, Australia at an elevation of 180 metres. The species epithet biloelensis derives from the Latin suffix "-ensis" meaning "place of origin" and refers to the township of Biloela near where the type specimen was collected.

== Description ==
The lichen forms a small-foliose (leafy) to somewhat crustose thallus that is tightly to very tightly adnate to its substrate, growing to 3–5 cm in width. It has contiguous lobes that are rarely weakly imbricate, flat, somewhat linear to irregular, and irregularly branched, measuring 0.5–1.0 mm wide. The upper surface is yellow-green but darkens with age, appearing shiny at the tips and dull and wrinkled (rugulose) within the thallus. With age, the thallus develops transverse cracks and becomes areolate in the centre. The upper surface lacks isidia and soredia (propagules for vegetative reproduction). The medulla is white, while the lower surface is pale brown to brown, darker at the apices, with sparse, simple, robust rhizines measuring 0.1–0.2 mm long.

The species is distinguished by its chemistry, containing usnic acid, colensoic acid (major component), and norcolensoic acid (trace). Colensoic acid is very rare among yellow-green Xanthoparmelia species; it occurs as the major medullary substance in only two other Xanthoparmelia species, X. ballingalliana and X. colensoica.

== Habitat and distribution ==
Xanthoparmelia biloelensis is known only from its type locality in Queensland, Australia, where it grows on volcanic rocks in pasture areas. At this location, it coexists with other lichen species including Acarospora citrina, Buellia substellulans, Diploschistes euganeus, and other Xanthoparmelia species.

== See also ==
- List of Xanthoparmelia species
