= Xanthoparmelia joranadia =

Conservation status
- Vulnerable (NatureServe)

Scientific classification
- Kingdom: Fungi
- Division: Ascomycota
- Class: Lecanoromycetes
- Order: Lecanorales
- Family: Parmeliaceae
- Genus: Xanthoparmelia
- Species: X. joranadia

Binomial name
- Xanthoparmelia joranadia (T.H.Nash) Hale 1974

Synonyms
- Parmelia joranadia T.H.Nash (1974)

Species of lichen found in the USA and Mexico

Xanthoparmelia joranadia is a lichen which belongs to the Xanthoparmelia genus. It is rare, and is listed as imperiled by the Nature Conservatory. It is noted for being similar to Xanthoparmelia arida and Xanthoparmelia lecanorica.

== Description ==
It grows to around 3–8 cm in diameter with shiny light yellow-green subirregular lobes that extend 1–2.5 mm wide. It has cylindrical isidia on the upper surface. The lower surface is pale brown. Xanthoparmelia joranadia is a member of the Xanthoparmelia mexicana group, a complex of similar species that differ mainly in their secondary chemistry.

== Habitat and range ==
This lichen is found in the North American southwest, with a majority of observations occurring in north Mexico and the US state of New Mexico.

== Chemistry ==
Xanthoparmelia joranadia contains lecanoric and usnic acids.

== See also ==
- List of Xanthoparmelia species
