= Xanthoparmelia barklyensis =

Scientific classification
- Kingdom: Fungi
- Division: Ascomycota
- Class: Lecanoromycetes
- Order: Lecanorales
- Family: Parmeliaceae
- Genus: Xanthoparmelia
- Species: X. barklyensis

Binomial name
- Xanthoparmelia barklyensis Hale (1986)

Species of lichen-forming fungus

Xanthoparmelia barklyensis is a species of saxicolous (rock-dwelling), foliose lichen in the family Parmeliaceae. Found in Southern Africa, it was formally described as a new species in 1986 by the American lichenologist Mason Hale. The type specimen was collected from Barkly Pass at an elevation of about 1,800 m (5,900 ft), where it was growing on sandstone. The lichen contains constipatic acid as well as associated fatty acids, and usnic acid. Hale suggested that this species could be a morphotype of Xanthoparmelia aliphatica, from which it differs by having a pale lower thallus surface.

== See also ==
- List of Xanthoparmelia species
