= Xanthoparmelia vicentei =

Scientific classification
- Domain: Eukaryota
- Kingdom: Fungi
- Division: Ascomycota
- Class: Lecanoromycetes
- Order: Lecanorales
- Family: Parmeliaceae
- Genus: Xanthoparmelia
- Species: X. vicentei

Binomial name
- Xanthoparmelia vicentei A.Crespo, M.C.Molina & Elix (2001)

Species of lichen

Xanthoparmelia vicentei is a species of saxicolous (rock-dwelling) foliose lichen in the family Parmeliaceae. Originally thought to be endemic to western Spain, it was discovered in Luxembourg in 2023, suggesting it may be more widespread in Europe than previously thought. The lichen forms yellowish-green thalli up to 7 cm wide with distinctive finger-like projections in the centre and rolled-back lobes with black tips. Chemical tests show it contains specific lichen products that help identify it from similar species.

== Taxonomy ==
The lichen was formally described as a new species in 2001 by the lichenologists Ana Crespo, María del Carmen Molina, and John Elix. The type specimen was collected from El Castañar (near Candelario) in Béjar, Salamanca, Spain, at an elevation of 1200 metres. It was found growing on granite rocks, collected by Crespo and Molina on 14 November 2000. The species epithet honours Carlos Vicente, "in honour of his many contributions to lichenology". The epithet was originally published as vicentii, but later corrected to vicentei.

== Description ==
Xanthoparmelia vicentii grows as a foliose (leaf-like) form, with a thallus that is loosely attached to its substrate and can extend up to 7 cm in width. Its lobes overlap loosely with somewhat irregular shapes, measuring 1–3 mm wide. A distinctive characteristic is the presence of dense lacinate-lobules (small, finger-like projections) in the central portion of the thallus. Collections from Luxembourg have shown that specimens can also be quite small, with much dissected lobes less than 1 mm wide. These smaller specimens lack isidia (vegetative reproductive structures), and, their lower surface is not uniformly black as in the type specimens, but predominantly brown and somewhat canaliculate (channelled).

The branching pattern of X. vicentii is extensive, with subdichotomous to subirregular branching. The lobes are revolute (rolled back) to subterete (somewhat cylindrical) in form. At their ends, the lobes display black tips that measure 0.2–0.8 mm in width.

The upper surface of the lichen appears yellow-green, with an undulate (wavy) to weakly convex texture. It lacks spots (described as emaculate) and features blackened margins that appear smooth and shiny at the lobe tips. As the lobes age, they become dull and rugulose (wrinkled), and lack both isidia and soredia (powdery reproductive structures).

Internally, the medulla (inner tissue) is white. The lower surface is predominantly black, though it may appear brown or mottled near the margins, with textured, channelled areas. The rhizines (root-like structures) are sparsely distributed across the lower surface, generally simple or occasionally branched, and black in colour.

=== Chemistry ===
Xanthoparmelia vicentii has distinct reactions to standard lichen spot tests. The cortex produces a K+ (yellow) reaction, whereas the medulla is K+ (yellow then red), C−, KC+ (yellow then red), and P+ (orange-red). The major secondary metabolites of this lichen are usnic acid and stictic acid. Minor chemical components include norstictic acid and constictic acid, while cryptostictic acid and lusitanic acid are present in trace amounts. This chemical profile, particularly the presence of the stictic acid chemosyndrome, serves as an important diagnostic feature for species identification.

== Habitat and distribution ==
Xanthoparmelia vicentii was initially thought to have a restricted geographic distribution, being found only in western Spain. However, in 2023, the species was reported for the first time in central Europe when it was discovered in Luxembourg, suggesting a potentially wider distribution than previously recognised.

The Luxembourg specimen was collected on siliceous rock along a road near Bourscheid in January 2023. The identity was confirmed through DNA analysis, with its ITS sequence showing 99.8% congruence with specimens from Spain. This specimen showed some morphological differences from the type material, particularly in having a lower surface that is predominantly brown rather than black throughout, as well as being somewhat canaliculate (channelled).

This species may be more widespread in central Europe than currently documented, as it could have been confused with X. angustiphylla or even discarded as small and incomplete specimens of the common X. conspersa. The Luxembourg specimen differs from typical X. conspersa in three morphological characters as well as its DNA sequence.

== See also ==
- List of Xanthoparmelia species
