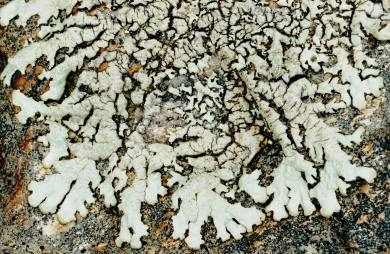

Conservation status
- Secure (NatureServe)

Scientific classification
- Kingdom: Fungi
- Division: Ascomycota
- Class: Lecanoromycetes
- Order: Lecanorales
- Family: Parmeliaceae
- Genus: Xanthoparmelia
- Species: X. plittii

Binomial name
- Xanthoparmelia plittii (Gyeln.) Hale (1974)

Synonyms
- Parmelia plittii Gyeln. (1931))

= Xanthoparmelia plittii =

Species of lichen found globally

Xanthoparmelia plittii is a foliose lichen in the genus Xanthoparmelia.

== Description ==
Xanthoparmelia plittii grows to around 4-10 cm in diameter with irregularly lobate lobes which are approximately 0.5-2 mm wide. The upper surface of the lichen is yellow-green, with cylindrical isidia. The lower surface is pale or medium brown in color with moderately to densely packed rhizines anchoring the lichen to the surface. Xanthoparmelia plittii is a member of the Xanthoparmelia mexicana group, a complex of similar species that differ mainly in their secondary chemistry.

== Habitat and range ==
Xanthoparmelia plittii has been observed mostly in North America, but has been found in South America and Europe as well.

== Chemistry ==
Xanthoparmelia plittii has been found to contain usnic acid and stictic acid.

== See also ==
- List of Xanthoparmelia species
