= Xanthoparmelia sleei =

Scientific classification
- Kingdom: Fungi
- Division: Ascomycota
- Class: Lecanoromycetes
- Order: Lecanorales
- Family: Parmeliaceae
- Genus: Xanthoparmelia
- Species: X. sleei

Binomial name
- Xanthoparmelia sleei Elix (2003)
- Location of the holotype in Western Australia

Species of foliose lichen

Xanthoparmelia sleei is a species of foliose lichen in the family Parmeliaceae, first described by John Alan Elix in 2003. It is endemic to Australia, with known occurrences in Western Australia and South Australia.

== Taxonomy ==
Xanthoparmelia sleei is identified within the Xanthoparmelia lineola complex, known for its tightly adnate thalli and transversely cracked upper surfaces in older lobes. This species distinguishes itself with unique chemical markers and areolate thallus centres.

== Description ==
The thallus of Xanthoparmelia sleei is foliose, tightly adnate, and can grow up to 5 cm (2 in) wide. Its lobes are flat, elongate, and range from 1.0 to 2.5 mm wide, branching subdichotomously. The upper surface is initially yellow-green and becomes darker over time, featuring a smooth, shiny texture that turns dull and rugulose with age. The thallus develops areolae—small cracked patches—especially in the centre.

The lower surface is smooth, ranging from ivory to tan or brown, and darker at the lobes' apices. Rhizines are sparse to moderately dense, simple, and colour-coordinated with the lower surface.

The lichen produces scattered apothecia, which are up to 1.0 mm wide, with a concave, dark brown disc. X. sleei does not produce isidia or soredia, which are common reproductive structures in many lichens.

== Chemistry ==
Chemical spot tests of the lichen reveal a medulla that reacts K+ (yellow) and KC+ (pink), indicating the presence of usnic acid and atranorin as major secondary metabolites, alongside several minor compounds including gyrophoric acid.

== Habitat and distribution ==
Xanthoparmelia sleei is found on laterite and granite rocks within dry, shrubby, sclerophyll forests and heathlands. Initially described from Mount Michael near Walkaway, Western Australia, additional specimens have been collected from both southern Western Australia and the Eyre Peninsula in South Australia, indicating a broader distribution within arid and semi-arid regions.

== See also ==
- List of Xanthoparmelia species
