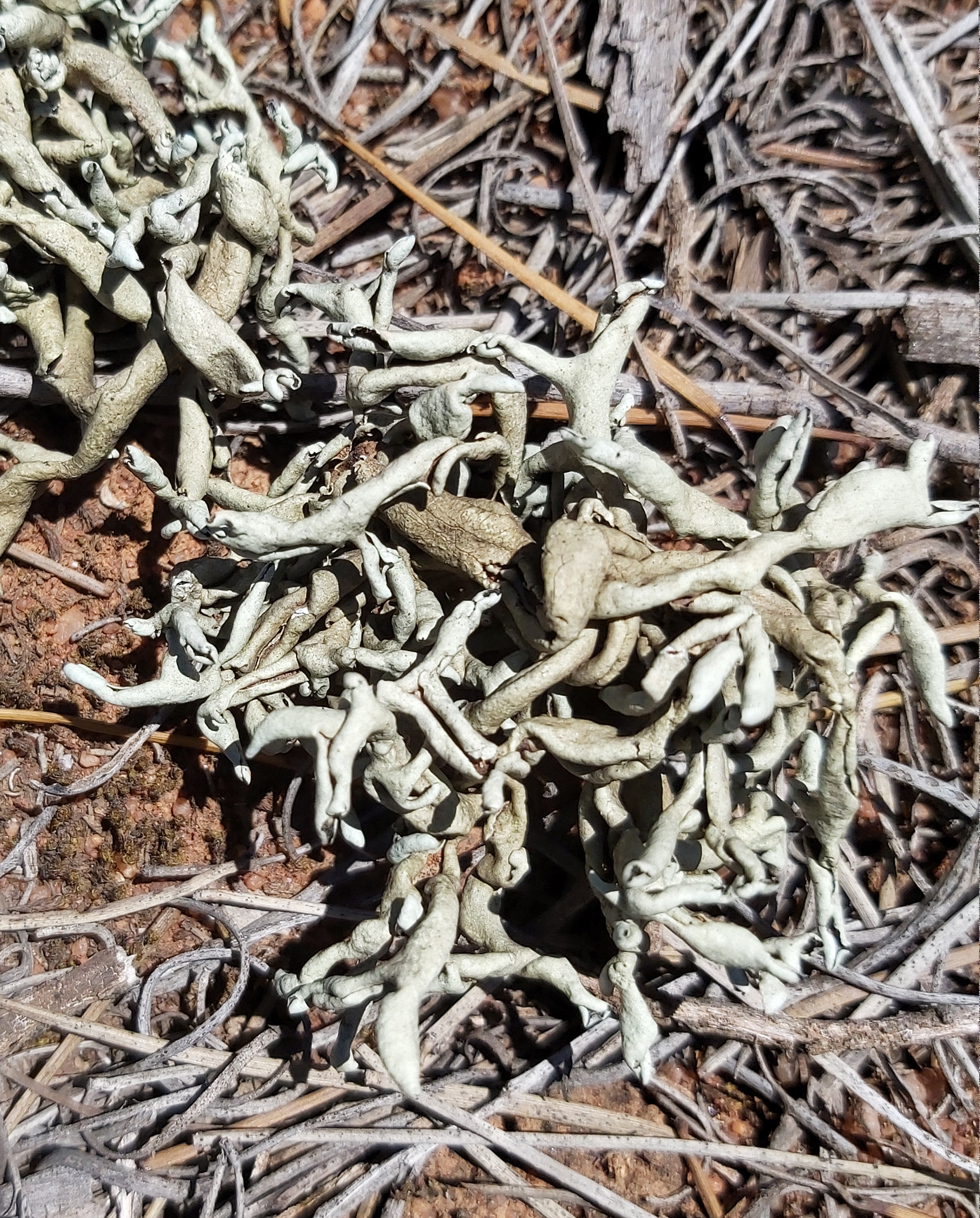
- In Whyalla Conservation Park, South Australia

Scientific classification
- Domain: Eukaryota
- Kingdom: Fungi
- Division: Ascomycota
- Class: Lecanoromycetes
- Order: Lecanorales
- Family: Parmeliaceae
- Genus: Xanthoparmelia
- Species: X. convoluta

Binomial name
- Xanthoparmelia convoluta (Kremp.) Hale

Synonyms
- List: Parmelia conspersa f. convoluta Rabenh.; Parmelia convoluta Kremp.; Parmelia convoluta Rabenh. ex Gyeln.; Parmelia vagans f. convoluta (Kremp.) Gyeln.; Parmelia desertorum f. convoluta (Kremp.) Gyeln.

= Xanthoparmelia convoluta =

Species of foliose lichen in the family Parmeliaceae

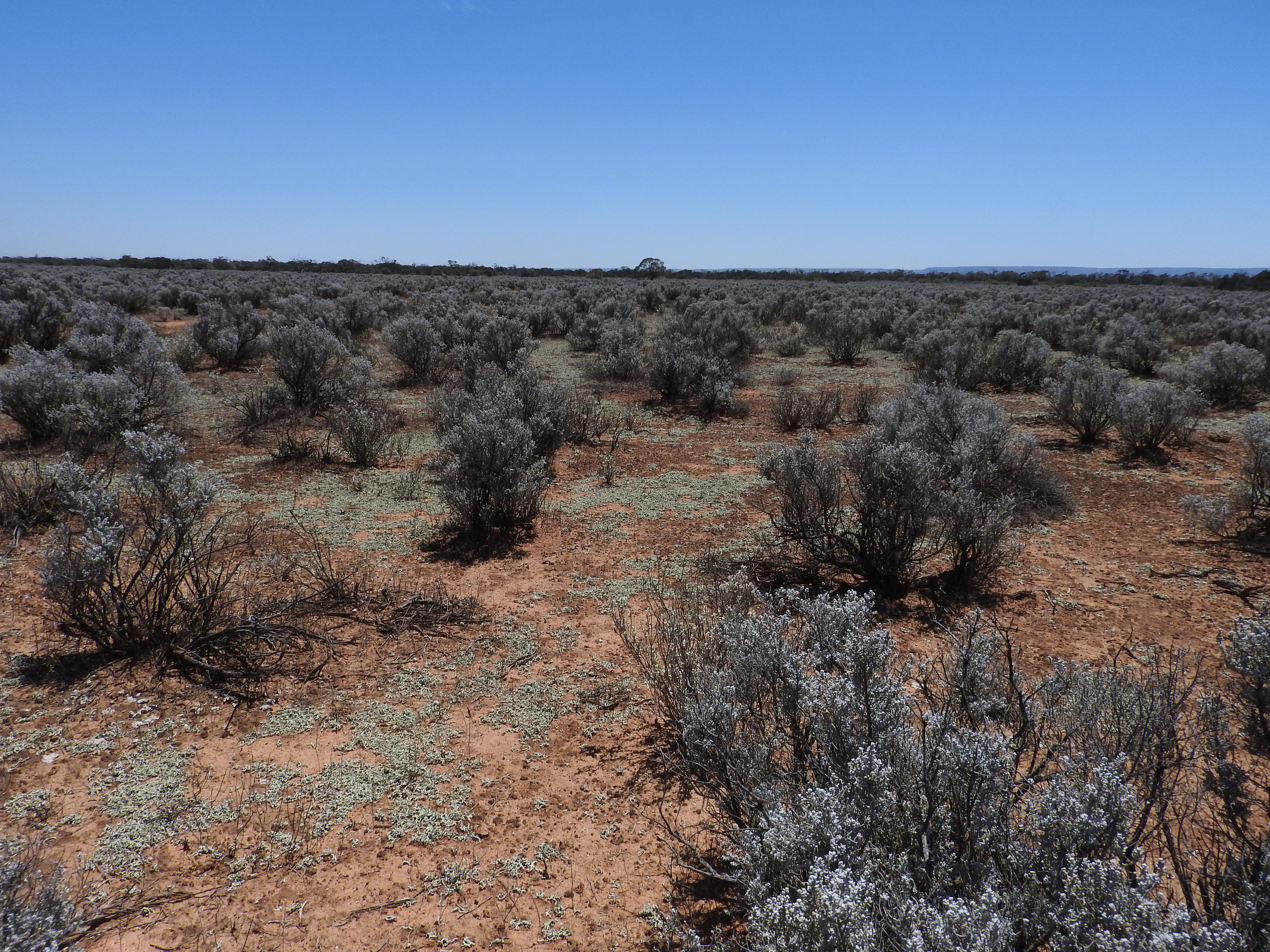
Growing abundantly at Whyalla Conservation Park, South Australia

Xanthoparmelia convoluta is a vagrant lichen in the family Parmeliaceae found in Australia. It lacks rhizenes that hold it to a substrate, so it lives its life moving about in the wind.

== Taxonomy ==
First described as Parmelia conspersa f. convoluta in 1871 by Gottlob Ludwig Rabenhorst, it was elevated from form to species in 1880 by August von Krempelhuber and was subsequently one of 93 species transferred to the genus Xanthoparmelia by Mason Hale 1974.

== See also ==
- List of Xanthoparmelia species
