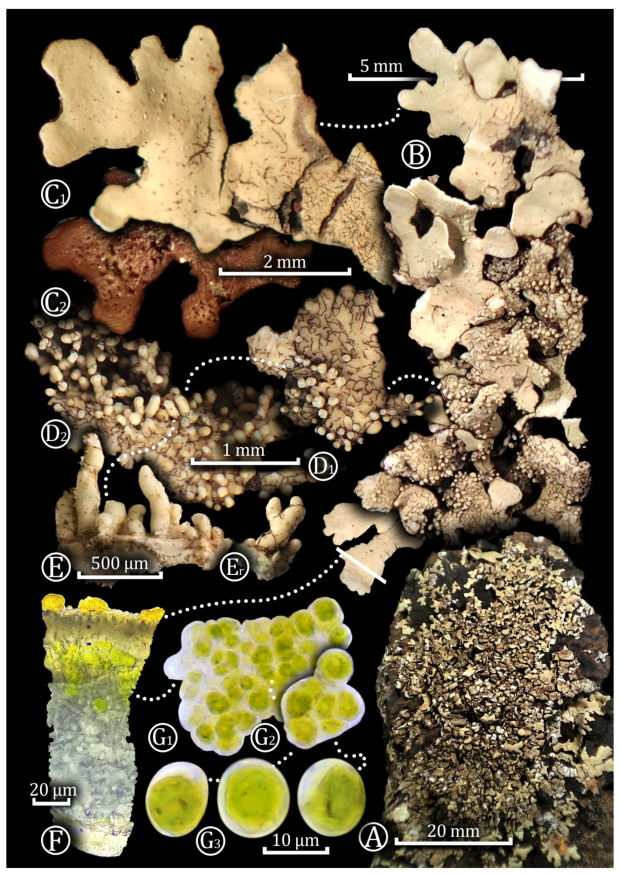
- Various aspects of morphology: A. Habit; B. Thallus lobes; C1–C2. Upper and lower surface; D1–D2, E–Er. Isidia; F. Transversal section through the thallus; G1, G2, G3. Photobiont cells.

Scientific classification
- Kingdom: Fungi
- Division: Ascomycota
- Class: Lecanoromycetes
- Order: Lecanorales
- Family: Parmeliaceae
- Genus: Xanthoparmelia
- Species: X. ramosiae

Binomial name
- Xanthoparmelia ramosiae Pérez-Vargas & Blázquez (2024)
- Holotype: La Isleta, Gran Canaria

= Xanthoparmelia ramosiae =

Species of lichen-forming fungus

Xanthoparmelia ramosiae is a species of saxicolous (rock-dwelling) foliose lichen in the family Parmeliaceae. Described in 2024 from Gran Canaria in the Canary Islands, the species is characterised by its yellow-green foliose thallus of narrow lobes bearing cylindrical isidia and a characteristic brown lower surface. It belongs to the Xanthoparmelia subramigera group, a mainly tropical lineage, and DNA evidence suggests it diverged from related African species approximately 3.5 million years ago during the Pliocene. The lichen grows exclusively on basaltic rocks in arid coastal shrublands at low elevations, where it forms part of a threatened type of vegetation that has been severely reduced by coastal development and urbanisation.

== Taxonomy ==
Xanthoparmelia ramosiae was described in 2024 as Xanthoparmelia ramosae by Israel Pérez-Vargas and Miguel Blázquez on the basis of an integrative study that combined morphology, secondary chemistry, macroclimatic data and DNA sequences from the ITS, nuLSU and mtSSU markers. The type specimen was collected on low-elevation basalt outcrops at La Isleta on the island of Gran Canaria, and the epithet honours the late Ana Ramos, a technician with the Cabildo de Gran Canaria who supported work on the conservation of the area. The specific epithet was subsequently corrected to ramosiae.

Phylogenetically, Xanthoparmelia ramosiae belongs to the X. subramigera group, a mainly tropical lineage of Xanthoparmelia that shares a brown lower surface, cylindrical isidia and fumarprotocetraric acid as the principal lichen substance in the medulla. Bayesian and maximum-likelihood analyses place the species in a strongly supported clade together with East African material from Kenya, forming a Macaronesia–Eastern Africa disjunction. A time-calibrated tree suggests that the X. subramigera group originated in the Miocene and that X. ramosiae diverged from its closest sampled African relatives in the Pliocene, around 3.5 million years ago.

== Description ==
Xanthoparmelia ramosiae forms closely attached foliose (leafy) thalli up to about 10 cm across. The lobes are narrow and elongate with rounded tips, generally 1–2.5 mm wide but often nearer 1 mm, and are mostly contiguous with only limited overlapping in the centre of the thallus. The upper surface is yellow-green and lacks spots (emaculate). Isidia are moderately dense to dense in the central parts of the thallus; they are at first more or less spherical and later cylindrical, usually simple but occasionally becoming coralloid, and can reach about 1 mm in height. Soredia are absent and the medulla is white.

The lower surface is mid-brown and does not become black; rhizines are sparse to moderately abundant, simple, the same colour as the lower surface and up to about 1 mm long. Apothecia and pycnidia were not seen in the type material, so the species is currently known only from vegetative structures. The photobiont is a green alga belonging to the Trebouxiophyceae, with Trebouxia-like coccoid cells that are mostly spherical but sometimes oval or irregularly shaped, typically around 12–15 μm in diameter. The fungal–algal contact is of the "simple" type without obvious haustorial invaginations.

Spot test reactions show a cortex that reacts K+ (yellow) and KC+ (yellow) but is otherwise negative, and a medulla that is KC+ (pink) and Pd+ (rusty orange); thin-layer chromatography detects usnic acid in the cortex and fumarprotocetraric acid in the medulla.

== Habitat and distribution ==
As of its original publication, Xanthoparmelia ramosiae was known to occur only at its type locality on La Isleta, a volcanic peninsula in the north-east of Gran Canaria in the Canary Islands. It grows on basaltic rock outcrops within lowland xerophytic shrubland ("tabaibal"), a community dominated by species of Euphorbia (such as E. lamarckii and E. aphylla), with scattered Lycium intricatum and introduced Opuntia species. The site experiences very low annual rainfall (less than about 160 mm), high solar radiation and strong winds, but north-east-facing slopes provide sufficiently humid microhabitats for well-developed lichen communities. This coastal shrub vegetation is regarded as a relict of an ancient xeric Rand flora dating back to the Tertiary period – a once more widespread arid-adapted floristic element now surviving in scattered refugia in Macaronesia and parts of Africa. Less than 15 % of its potential extent on the Canary Islands is thought to remain, largely because urban expansion and the development of tourism infrastructure have taken over much of the coastal zone.

Within its habitat, X. ramosiae occurs together with fruticose lichens such as species of Ramalina (especially from the bourgaeana group) and Seirophora scorigena, and with various crustose taxa including Diploicia canescens, Pertusaria etayoi and several Lecidea species. Macroclimatic analyses indicate that the species occupies warmer and drier conditions than closely related members of the X. subramigera group in sub-Saharan Africa, reinforcing its status as a narrow endemic of arid coastal basalt outcrops on Gran Canaria.

== See also ==
- List of Xanthoparmelia species
