= Xanthoparmelia isidiovagans =

Scientific classification
- Domain: Eukaryota
- Kingdom: Fungi
- Division: Ascomycota
- Class: Lecanoromycetes
- Order: Lecanorales
- Family: Parmeliaceae
- Genus: Xanthoparmelia
- Species: X. isidiovagans

Binomial name
- Xanthoparmelia isidiovagans O.Blanco, A.Crespo, Divakar & Elix (2005)

Species of lichen

Xanthoparmelia isidiovagans is a species of foliose lichen in the family Parmeliaceae. It is known to occur in Spain and Turkey.

== Taxonomy ==
First found in Spain, it was formally described as a new species in 2005 by lichenologists Oscar Blanco, Ana Crespo, Pradeep Divakar, and John Elix. The type specimen was collected in Torremocha del Pinar (Guadalajara) at an elevation of 1,200 m (3,900 ft). Here the lichen was found growing as a vagrant on the soil in open forest dominated by Juniperus thurifera and J. communis var. hemisphaerica. The specific epithet isidiovagans alludes to its resemblance to the American species Xanthoparmelia vagans, from which it differs by the presence of isidia.

== Description ==
The yellowish-green thallus of Xanthoparmelia isidiovagans reaches a diameter of 2–4 cm (0.8–1.6 in), comprising elongated, linear lobes measuring 1–3 mm (0.04–0.12 in) wide. It contains several secondary metabolites, including stictic acid as a major metabolite, usnic acid, norstictic acid, constictic acid, and cryptostictic acid as minor metabolites, and trace amounts of peristictic acid.

This species can be readily distinguished from the similar X. pseudohungarica by three key features: the presence of globose isidia on its upper surface (which X. pseudohungarica lacks entirely), its black lower surface (compared to the brown lower surface of X. pseudohungarica), and the presence of the stictic acid chemosyndrome in its medulla, which provides a distinctive chemical profile compared to its relative.

== Habitat and distribution ==
Initially described from Spain, Xanthoparmelia isidiovagans was reported from two localities in Eskişehir Province, Turkey. Both sites receive abundant sunlight and feature scattered Juniperus excelsa subsp. excelsa trees. Several lichen species were commonly found growing on soil in these areas, including Aspicilia hispida, Cladonia foliacea, C. rangiformis, and Cetraria aculeata. Additionally, Aspicilia desertorum was observed on small rocks at both locations, while Xanthoparmelia pokornyi was exclusively found on soil at the first site. Cetraria islandica was also discovered growing on soil in areas protected by J. excelsa subsp. excelsa at this first location. These sites share similar climatic conditions, vegetation patterns, and dry characteristics with the type locality of X. isidiovagans.

== See also ==
- List of Xanthoparmelia species
