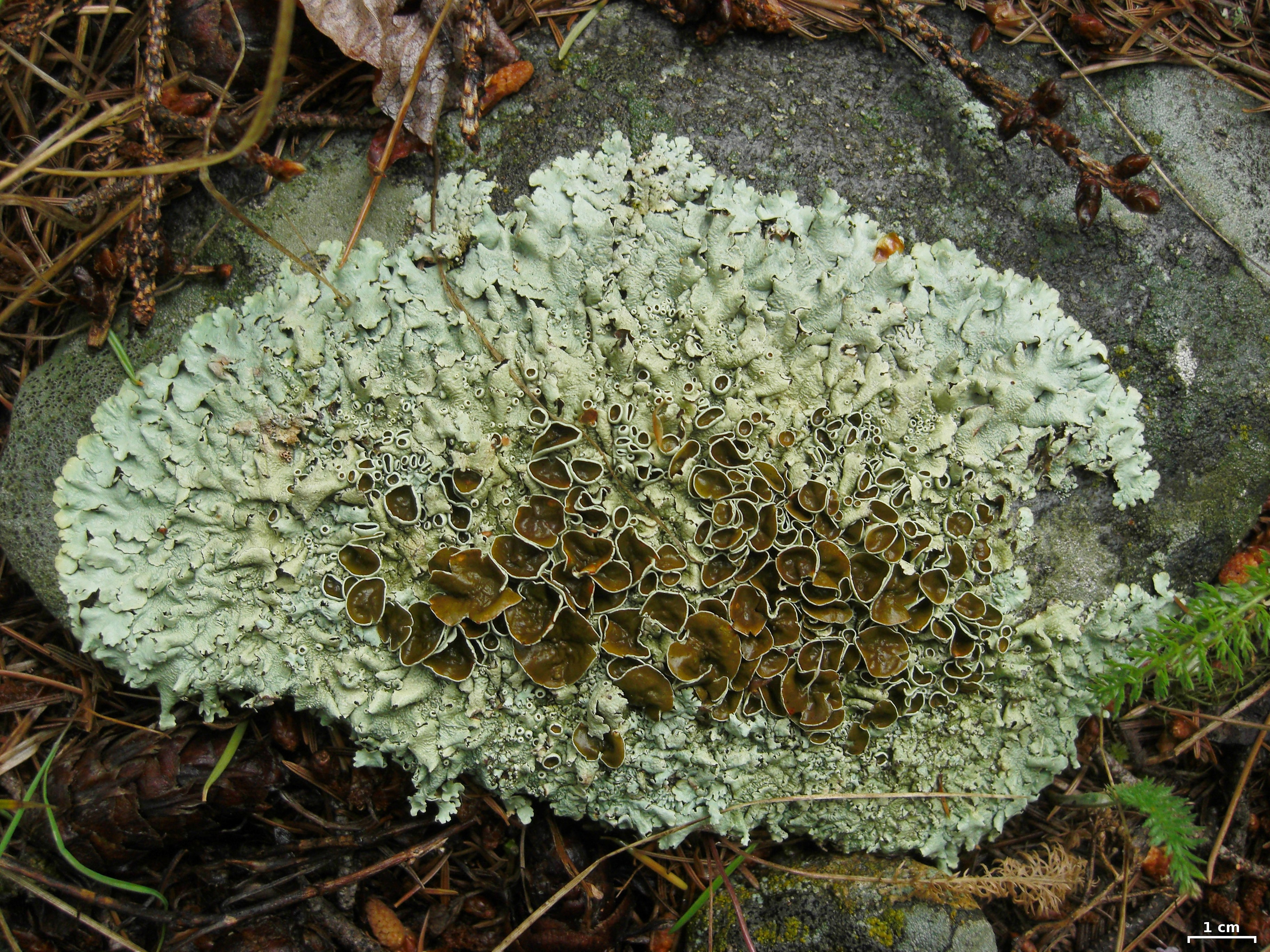
- In Sweetgrass Hills, Montana

Conservation status
- Secure (NatureServe)

Scientific classification
- Kingdom: Fungi
- Division: Ascomycota
- Class: Lecanoromycetes
- Order: Lecanorales
- Family: Parmeliaceae
- Genus: Xanthoparmelia
- Species: X. lineola

Binomial name
- Xanthoparmelia lineola (E.C.Berry) Hale (1974)

Synonyms
- Parmelia lineola E.C.Berry (1941)

= Xanthoparmelia lineola =

Species of foliose lichen

Xanthoparmelia lineola, commonly known as the tight rock-shield, is a foliose lichen species in the genus Xanthoparmelia. It is a common species with a temperate distribution. Found in North America and South Africa, it grows on rocks.

== Taxonomy ==
It was originally described in 1941 as a species of Parmelia by Edward Cain Berry. It was one of 93 species that was transferred to Xanthoparmelia when Mason Hale promoted that taxon from subgeneric to generic status in 1974. It is commonly known as the tight rock-shield.

== Description ==
Xanthoparmelia lineola has a thallus that is tightly attached (adnate) on its rock substrate. Yellowish green in colour, it grows to 3–10 cm (1.2–3.9 in) in diameter. The lobes are irregular in shape and measure 0.8–2 mm wide. Isidia and soredia are not present on the thallus. The medulla is white with a flat lower surface. The rhizines are pale, unbranched, and measure 0.2–0.4 mm long. The lichen has well-developed apothecia (2–5 in diameter) that sit on rudimentary stalks. The ascospores are 6–7 by 9–12 um.

Xanthoparmelia lineola contains the compounds salazinic, consalazinic, constipatic, protoconstipatic, and usnic acids.

=== Similar species ===
Xanthoparmelia lineola is one of several morphologically similar species that contain salazinic acid and form a continuum based on the degree of agnation to the substrate. X. coloradoensis is loosely attached, X. wyomingica is even more loosely attached, while X. chlorochroa at maturity is not attached to a substrate (a vagrant lichen).

== Habitat and distribution ==
Xanthoparmelia lineola is known from northern North America and South Africa. Populations from Australia previously considered X. lineola have been since characterized with DNA analysis and assigned to a new species, X. knudsenii. It has a widespread distribution in western North America. In a study of Xanthoparmelia lichens in Arizona, Thomas Nash observed that this species seemed to develop best at elevations of 1,500–2,100 metres (4,900–6,900 ft), where individuals grew to cover half or more of the exposed rock face beneath ponderosa pines. It is common on north-facing rocks in the Arizona desert. The lichen can also be found growing in dry habitats on tree bases covered with wind-blown dust.

Five morphologically similar chemotypes of Xanthoparmelia lineola are known from North America: X. subdecipiens, X. cumberlandia, X. oleosa, and X. novomexicana.

== See also ==
- List of Xanthoparmelia species
