= Xanthoparmelia stuartioides =

Scientific classification
- Kingdom: Fungi
- Division: Ascomycota
- Class: Lecanoromycetes
- Order: Lecanorales
- Family: Parmeliaceae
- Genus: Xanthoparmelia
- Species: X. stuartioides

Binomial name
- Xanthoparmelia stuartioides Elix (2004)
- Holotype: near Blackdown Tableland National Park, Queensland, Australia

Species of lichen

Xanthoparmelia stuartioides is a rare species of saxicolous (rock-dwelling) foliose lichen in the family Parmeliaceae. This lichen is known only from its type locality near Blackdown Tableland in Queensland, Australia. It forms a small yellowish-green thallus up to 4 cm wide that closely adheres to sandstone rocks in dry sclerophyll forest. The species can be identified by its narrow separate lobes, small finger-like projections on its surface, brown lower surface, and its chemical composition featuring protocetraric acid. While similar to X. stuartensis in several aspects, it is distinguished by its smaller size and differently shaped lobes with notched rather than rounded tips.

== Taxonomy ==
Xanthoparmelia stuartioides was described as a new species by the lichenologist John A. Elix in 2004. The type specimen was collected at a bluff along the road to Blackdown Tableland, 30 km southeast of Blackwater, Queensland, Australia at an elevation of 600 metres. The species epithet stuartioides derives from the Greek suffix "-oides" meaning "resembling or having the form of" and refers to its similarity to X. stuartensis.

== Description ==
The lichen forms a small leaf-like to somewhat crust-like (crustose) structure that clings closely or very closely to its substrate surface, growing to 4 cm in width. Its lobes are separate or rarely touching, somewhat linear to elongated-linear in shape, branching in patterns that fork into two, measuring 0.3–1.0 mm wide, with notched tips. The upper surface is pale yellow-green when young (darkening as it ages), flat, initially shiny but becoming dull, smooth or slightly wrinkled (rugulose), developing cracks across its width as it ages and breaking into small areas (areolate) in the center. The surface lacks powdery reproductive structures (soredia) but has small projections (isidiate) with rounded to short cylindrical finger-like growths (isidia) that are simple with fused outer layers, blackened, intact tips. The inner layer (medulla) is white, while the lower surface is flat, smooth, brown with darker brown at the tips. The root-like attachments (rhizines) are moderately dense, sturdy, simple, matching in colour, and 0.1–0.4 mm long.

Xanthoparmelia stuartioides is characterised by its adnate to tightly adnate, small-foliose to somewhat crustose thallus, narrow separate lobes with incised (notched) tips, brown lower surface, simple subglobose to short-cylindrical isidia, and its medullary chemistry. It contains usnic acid (minor), protocetraric acid (major), and virensic acid (trace). While X. stuartioides resembles X. stuartensis in having a brown lower surface, an isidiate upper surface, and identical medullary chemistry, it differs in having a smaller thallus with narrower (0.3–1.0 mm vs. 1–3 mm), somewhat linear to elongated lobes with incised tips rather than the broader, irregular lobes with subrotund apices found in X. stuartensis.

== Habitat and distribution ==
Xanthoparmelia stuartioides is known only from its type locality in Queensland, Australia, where it grows on sandstone rocks in dry sclerophyll forest above the escarpment. At this location, it grows together with other lichens including Acarospora citrina, Dirinaria flava, Pyrrhospora sanguinolenta, Ramboldia petraeoides, Rimelia reticulata and other Xanthoparmelia species.

== See also ==
- List of Xanthoparmelia species
