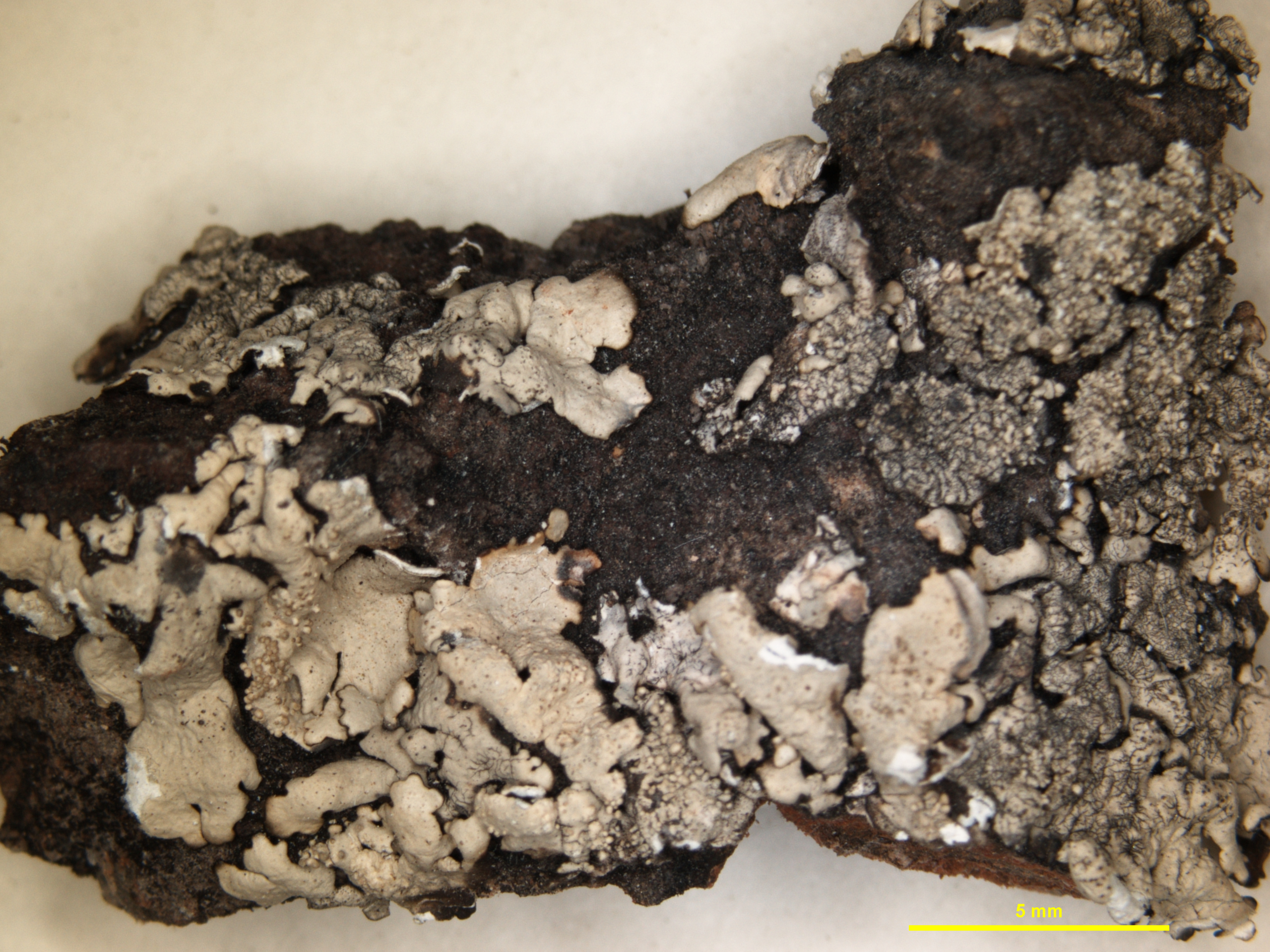

Conservation status
- Vulnerable (NatureServe)

Scientific classification
- Kingdom: Fungi
- Division: Ascomycota
- Class: Lecanoromycetes
- Order: Lecanorales
- Family: Parmeliaceae
- Genus: Xanthoparmelia
- Species: X. ajoensis

Binomial name
- Xanthoparmelia ajoensis (T.H.Nash) Egan (1975)

Synonyms
- Parmelia ajoensis T.H.Nash (1974)

= Xanthoparmelia ajoensis =

Species of lichen found in the USA and Mexico

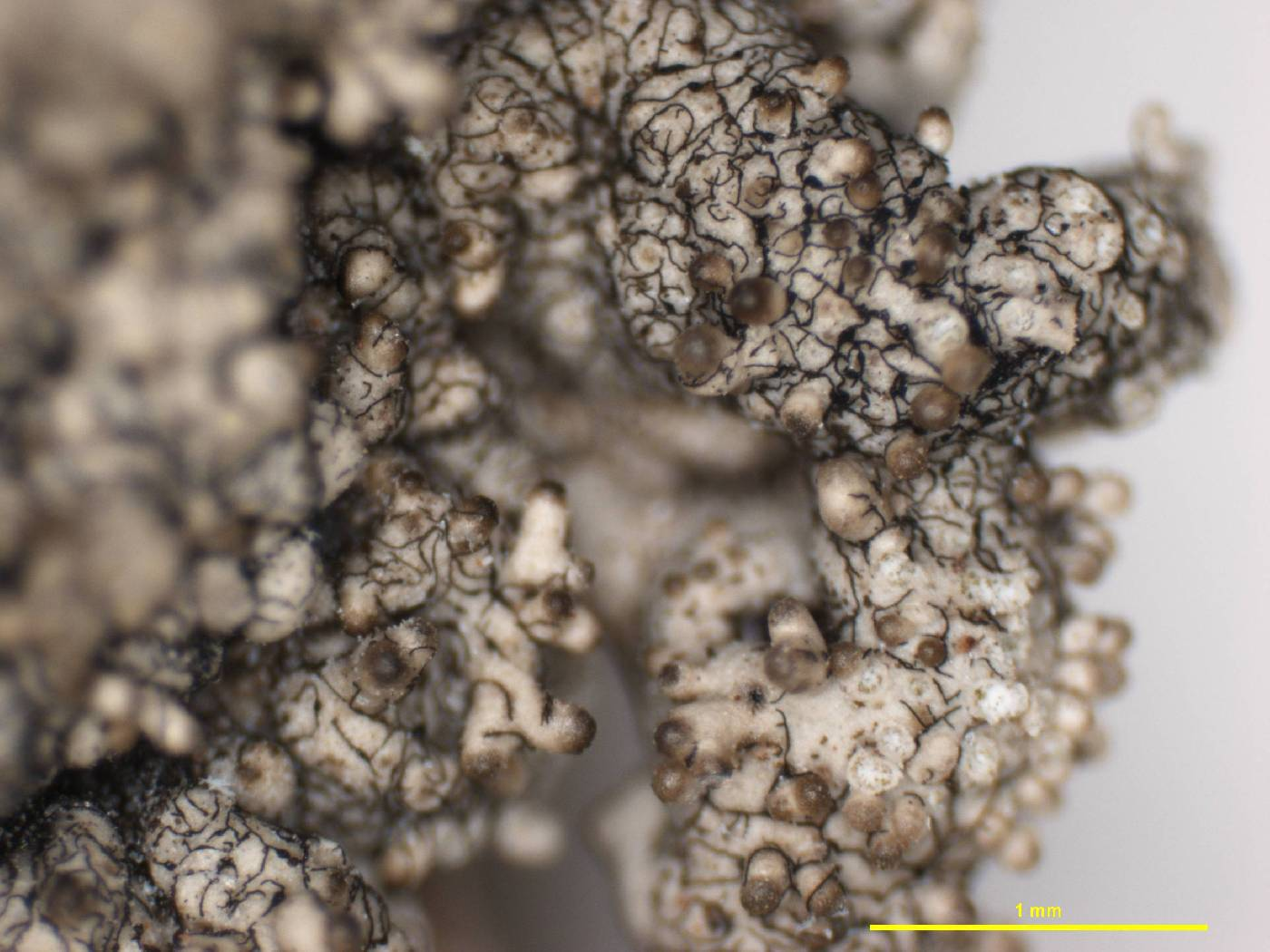
Magnified image of Xanthoparmelia ajoensis

Xanthoparmelia ajoensis is a foliose lichen that belongs to the genus Xanthoparmelia. The lichen is uncommon and is listed as vulnerable by the Nature Conservatory.

== Description ==
Xanthoparmelia ajoensis grows to around 2–6 cm in diameter with irregularly lobate lobes which are approximately 1–3 mm wide. The upper surface of the lichen is yellow-green with cylindrical isidia. The lower surface is pale brown to brown. Xanthoparmelia ajoensis is a member of the Xanthoparmelia mexicana group, a complex of similar species that differ mainly in their secondary chemistry.

== Habitat and range ==
Xanthoparmelia ajoensis is found in the North American southwest including the US states of Arizona, California, Colorado, and New Mexico and the Mexican states of Sinaloa and Sonora.

== Chemistry ==
Xanthoparmelia ajoensis has been recorded as containing usnic acid, 3-α-hydroxybarbatic acid, and diffractaic acid.

== See also ==
- List of Xanthoparmelia species
