= Xanthoparmelia fangii =

Scientific classification
- Kingdom: Fungi
- Division: Ascomycota
- Class: Lecanoromycetes
- Order: Lecanorales
- Family: Parmeliaceae
- Genus: Xanthoparmelia
- Species: X. fangii

Binomial name
- Xanthoparmelia fangii Elix (2006)
- Holotype: near Bruce Rock, Western Australia

Species of lichen

Xanthoparmelia fangii is a species of saxicolous (rock-dwelling) foliose lichen in the family Parmeliaceae. Described as a new species in 2006, it occurs in Western Australia.

== Taxonomy ==
The species was first scientifically described in 2006 by the lichenologist John Elix. The holotype was collected near Bruce Rock in Western Australia. The species is named after Fang Chang Sha, an Australian botanist and lichen collector.

== Description ==
Xanthoparmelia fangii features a foliose, adnate thallus that can reach up to 4 cm in width. The lobes of the thallus are separate or contiguous, measuring 0.8–1.5 mm wide, and feature incised (notched) tips. The upper surface is yellow-green, typically flat or weakly concave, and becomes dull and tangentially cracked with age. It lacks soredia but includes moderate to dense isidia that are spherical then cylindrical and not coralloid.

The medulla is white, while the lower surface is smooth and ranges from ivory to pale brown. Rhizines are sparse, simple, and the same colour as the thallus. Chemical spot tests on the cortex yield a K+ (pale yellow) reaction, while the medulla tests K−, C+ (red), and KC+ (red).

Chemical constituents of Xanthoparmelia fangii include minor usnic acid, trace atranorin, minor or trace lecanoric acid, major gyrophoric acid, minor constipatic acid, minor protoconstipatic acid, and trace 3-hydroxygyrophoric acid.

== Habitat and distribution ==
Xanthoparmelia fangii is found in south-western Western Australia, particularly on granite outcrops in open Eucalyptus–Acacia woodlands. It is known from several locations including its type locality near Bruce Rock.

== See also ==
- List of Xanthoparmelia species
