= Xanthoparmelia fracticollis =

Scientific classification
- Kingdom: Fungi
- Division: Ascomycota
- Class: Lecanoromycetes
- Order: Lecanorales
- Family: Parmeliaceae
- Genus: Xanthoparmelia
- Species: X. fracticollis

Binomial name
- Xanthoparmelia fracticollis Elix (2004)
- Holotype: along the Barrier Highway, New South Wales, Australia

Species of lichen

Xanthoparmelia fracticollis is a species of saxicolous (rock-dwelling) foliose lichen in the family Parmeliaceae. It was first described in 2004, with its species name referencing Broken Hill, New South Wales, where the type specimen was collected. The lichen forms a yellowish-green leafy thallus up to 6 cm wide with distinctive curled edges that grows closely attached to rocks in semi-arid regions of western New South Wales and northern South Australia. It can be identified by its overlapping lobes, absence of vegetative propagules, pale lower surface, and its chemical composition that includes usnic acid and norstictic acid. The species typically co-occurs with other lichens including other Xanthoparmelia species and can be distinguished from similar species like X. metaclystoides by its convex, somewhat ascending lobes.

== Taxonomy ==
Xanthoparmelia fracticollis was described as a new species by the lichenologist John A. Elix in 2004. The type specimen was collected along the Barrier Highway, 15 km west of Broken Hill, New South Wales, Australia at an elevation of 350 metres. The species epithet fracticollis refers to the place of origin of the type material, namely in the vicinity of Broken (Latin, fractus) Hill (Latin, collis).

== Description ==
The lichen forms a foliose (leafy) structure that clings closely or very closely to its substrate surface, growing to 4–6 cm in width. Its lobes overlap or touch each other, appearing flat to noticeably rounded, with somewhat irregular shapes and branching patterns, measuring 1–3 mm wide. The edges and older lobes distinctly curl under and lift slightly upward. The upper surface is yellow-green when young (darkening as it ages), shiny at the tips, and becomes wrinkled, cracked and divided into small areas (areolate) over time. It lacks small lobes (lobulae), powdery reproductive structures (soredia), and small finger-like projections (isidia). The inner layer (medulla) is white. The lower surface of the thallus is light to darker brown with sparse, simple, brown root-like attachments (rhizines) that are very short (about 0.1 mm long). Reproductive discs (apothecia) are common in X. fracticollis. They are attached directly to the surface, and measure 1–5 mm wide with dark brown, shiny centres that flatten and become wavy and distorted with age. The reproductive spores (ascospores) are oval-shaped (ellipsoid), measuring 9–10 by 6–7 μm.

Xanthoparmelia fracticollis is characterised by the development of convex, revolute, somewhat ascending lobes along the margins or in the centre of the thallus, the lack of vegetative propagules, the pale lower surface and the medullary chemistry. It contains several secondary metabolites: usnic acid (minor), norstictic acid (major), connorstictic acid (minor) and salazinic acid (trace). X. fracticollis could be confused with X. metaclystoides, but the latter has flat lobes that remain tightly attached throughout and contains substantial amounts of salazinic acid in the medulla.

== Habitat and distribution ==
Xanthoparmelia fracticollis occurs on exposed, acidic rocks in semi-arid areas of western New South Wales and northern South Australia. It often co-occurs with other Xanthoparmelia species, Acarospora citrina, Caloplaca species, and Lecanora farinacea.

== See also ==
- List of Xanthoparmelia species
