= Xanthoparmelia perezdepazii =

Scientific classification
- Kingdom: Fungi
- Division: Ascomycota
- Class: Lecanoromycetes
- Order: Lecanorales
- Family: Parmeliaceae
- Genus: Xanthoparmelia
- Species: X. perezdepazii

Binomial name
- Xanthoparmelia perezdepazii Pérez-Vargas, Hern.-Padr. & Elix (2007)

Species of lichen

Xanthoparmelia perezdepazii is a species of saxicolous (rock-dwelling), foliose lichen in the family Parmeliaceae. It is found in the Canary Islands.

== Taxonomy ==
The lichen was formally described as a new species in 2007 by Israel Pérez-Vargas, Consuelo Hernández-Padron, and John Alan Elix. The type specimen was collected by the first two authors from Llano de la Santidad in Teide National Park (Tenerife) at an altitude of 2,000 m (6,600 ft), where it was found growing on basaltic rocks. The species epithet honours Professor Pedro Luis Pérez de Paz, "in recognition of his many contributions to Canarian lichenology".

== Description ==
The lichen has a yellow-green thallus measuring 3–10 cm (1.2–3.9 in) wide; the lobes comprising the thallus are 1–2.5 mm (0.04–0.10 in) wide. Soredia are absent, but there is a dense covering of isidia on the thallus surface; these structures are initially spherical, later becoming cylindrical, and measuring up to 1 mm high. The medulla is white, while the lower thallus surface is mid- to dark-brown, but not blackened (as is typical with many other Xanthoparmelia species). Rhizines are simples (i.e., unbranched), more or less the same colour as the undersurface, and measure up to 1 mm long. Neither apothecia nor pycnidia were present in the type collection. The lichen products present in X. perezdepazii are usnic acid, constipatic acid, and protoconstipatic acid.

== Habitat and distribution ==
Xanthoparmelia perezdepazii is only known to occur in the Canary Islands. Its habitat is the shrub-like community known as "retamar", found at high elevations, and featuring Cytisus supranubius, Pterocephalus lasiospermus, and Pinus canariensis. The lichen tends to be better developed in northeast-facing locations, where typical associating lichens include Glaucomaria rupicola, Rhizoplaca melanophthalma, Physcia albinea, Xanthoparmelia tinctina, and crustose species from the genera Aspicilia and Caloplaca.

== See also ==
- List of Xanthoparmelia species
