= Xanthoparmelia epigaea =

Scientific classification
- Kingdom: Fungi
- Division: Ascomycota
- Class: Lecanoromycetes
- Order: Lecanorales
- Family: Parmeliaceae
- Genus: Xanthoparmelia
- Species: X. epigaea

Binomial name
- Xanthoparmelia epigaea Hale (1986)

Species of lichen

Xanthoparmelia epigaea is a species of terricolous (ground-dwelling), foliose lichen in the family Parmeliaceae. Found in Southern Africa, it was formally described as a new species in 1986 by the American lichenologist Mason Hale. The type specimen was collected from Cape Province at an elevation of 200 m (660 ft), where it was found growing in a flat pasture on soil, quartzite pebbles, and schist. The lichen has a light yellowish thallus that measures 3 to 5 cm (1.2 to 2.0 in) in diameter, although neighbouring colonies can join together and cover more extensive areas. It contains constipatic acid and associated fatty acids, and usnic acid.

== See also ==
- List of Xanthoparmelia species
