= Xanthoparmelia convolutoides =

Scientific classification
- Kingdom: Fungi
- Division: Ascomycota
- Class: Lecanoromycetes
- Order: Lecanorales
- Family: Parmeliaceae
- Genus: Xanthoparmelia
- Species: X. convolutoides

Binomial name
- Xanthoparmelia convolutoides Elix (2006)
- Holotype: road to Mount Gibson Sanctuary, Western Australia

Species of foliose lichen

Xanthoparmelia convolutoides is a species of foliose lichen in the family Parmeliaceae. Native to Western Australia, it grows on acidic rocks in semi-arid woodland environments. The lichen features a leafy thallus (1–3 cm wide) with contiguous to weakly overlapping lobes that are tightly attached to its substrate, displaying a distinctive grey upper surface with white spots near the tips, and an ivory to pale brown lower surface. It is chemically characterized by the presence of atranorin and norlobaridone, and is morphologically similar to but distinct from Xanthoparmelia convoluta.

== Taxonomy ==
Xanthoparmelia convolutoides was described as a new species in 2006 by the lichenologist John Elix. The species epithet convolutoides derives from the Greek oides (resembling) and refers to its similarity to Xanthoparmelia convoluta, yet distinguished by several morphological and chemical traits.

== Description ==
The thallus of Xanthoparmelia convolutoides is foliose (leafy), very tightly attached to its substrate (adnate, ranging in size from 1 to 3 cm wide. The lobes are contiguous to weakly imbricate (overlapping), flat to weakly convex, and somewhat linear to irregularly shaped. They are irregularly branched, measuring 0.2–0.8 mm in width with incised (notched) tips. The upper surface is grey, turns dark with age, is smooth initially but becomes rugulose (wrinkled), and is distinctively white maculate (spotted) near the tips. It lacks soredia and isidia.

The medulla is white, and the lower surface is smooth, ranging from ivory to pale brown, darkening at the apices. Rhizines are sparse to moderate, simple, and the same colour as the thallus.

Chemical spot tests on the cortex yield a K+ (yellow) reaction; the medulla tests K−, C−, KC−, and P+. Key secondary metabolites include atranorin (major), norlobaridone (major), and subnorlobaridone in trace amounts.

== Habitat and distribution ==
Xanthoparmelia convolutoides inhabits semi-arid regions of Western Australia, typically found on exposed, acidic rocks. This species adapts well to sparse woodland environments.

== See also ==
- List of Xanthoparmelia species
