= Xanthoparmelia lecanorica =

Scientific classification
- Kingdom: Fungi
- Division: Ascomycota
- Class: Lecanoromycetes
- Order: Lecanorales
- Family: Parmeliaceae
- Genus: Xanthoparmelia
- Species: X. lecanorica

Binomial name
- Xanthoparmelia lecanorica Hale (1974)

Synonyms
- Parmelia lecanorica Hale (1971)

Species of lichen found in the USA and Mexico

Xanthoparmelia lecanorica is a foliose lichen that belongs to the genus Xanthoparmelia. It is noted for being similar in appearance, and has often been misidentified as, Xanthoparmelia arida.

== Description ==
Xanthoparmelia lecanorica grows to around 3–5 cm in diameter with broad yellow-green sub irregular lobes that extend 1–2 mm wide. The underside is dark brown to black, with simple rhizines approximately 0.2-0.5 mm long.

== Habitat and range ==
Xanthoparmelia lecanorica is found in South Africa. At times, specimens of Xanthoparmelia arida have been misidentified in North America as Xanthoparmelia lecanorica.

== Chemistry ==
Xanthoparmelia lecanorica has been recorded as containing both lecanoric and usnic acids.

== See also ==
- List of Xanthoparmelia species
