= Xanthoparmelia canobolasensis =

Scientific classification
- Kingdom: Fungi
- Division: Ascomycota
- Class: Lecanoromycetes
- Order: Lecanorales
- Family: Parmeliaceae
- Genus: Xanthoparmelia
- Species: X. canobolasensis

Binomial name
- Xanthoparmelia canobolasensis Elix 1993

Species of lichen found in Australia

Xanthoparmelia canobolasensis is a lichen which belongs to the Xanthoparmelia genus. It is found in the Australian states of New South Wales and Tasmania. Although not currently endangered, it appears to fulfill the criteria under the Tasmanian Threatened Species Protection Act 1995.

== Description ==
This lichen grows to around 5–10 cm in diameter, with slightly irregular and long imbricate lobes measuring approximately 1-3mm wide with visible black margins. The upper surface of the lichen is yellow-green, but becomes gray with age.

== Habitat and range ==
Xanthoparmelia canobolasensis and Xanthoparmelia metastrigosa are known to be found in the area surrounding Mount Canobolas, with the range of Xanthoparmelia canobolasensis also extending into the dry forests on the island of Tasmania.

== See also ==
- List of Xanthoparmelia species
