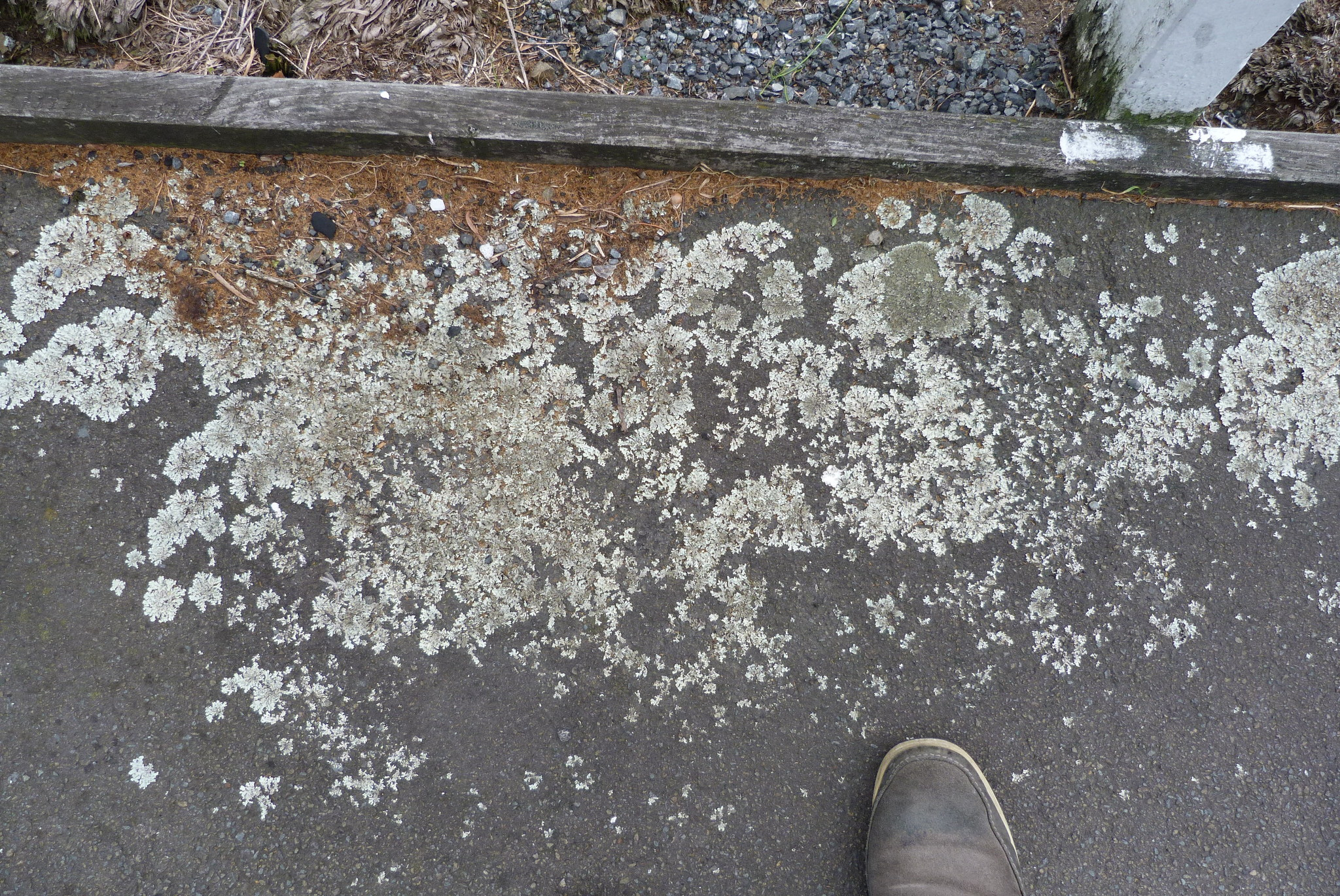
- At the edge of a footpath in Wellington, New Zealand

Scientific classification
- Domain: Eukaryota
- Kingdom: Fungi
- Division: Ascomycota
- Class: Lecanoromycetes
- Order: Lecanorales
- Family: Parmeliaceae
- Genus: Xanthoparmelia
- Species: X. scabrosa

Binomial name
- Xanthoparmelia scabrosa (Taylor) Hale (1974)

Synonyms
- Parmelia scabrosa Taylor (1847); Parmelia conspersa var. hypoclystoides Müll.Arg. (1883); Parmelia subexasperata Gyeln. (1931); Parmelia protoisidiata Gyeln. (1934); Parmelia hypoclystoides (Müll.Arg.) Gyeln. (1935); Parmelia subreagens Gyeln. (1938); Parmelia scabropustulata Elix (1981); Xanthoparmelia hypoclystoides (Müll.Arg.) Hale (1974)

= Xanthoparmelia scabrosa =

Species of lichen

Xanthoparmelia scabrosa, jocularly known as sexy footpath lichen or sexy pavement lichen, is a foliose lichen in the family Parmeliaceae. It tolerates a very wide range of substrata, predominantly rock but also tree bark, roofing tiles, glass, and in wetter areas bitumen paths and roads.

== Taxonomy and naming ==
The lichen was first formally described under the name Parmelia scabrosa in 1847 by botanist Thomas Taylor. The type was collected by botanist James Drummond near Swan River in Western Australia. It became known as a species of Xanthoparmelia in 1974 when Mason Hale promoted that subgenus of Parmelia to generic status.

The lichen was dubbed 'sexy footpath lichen' in a talk for the Auckland Botanical Society by Allison Knight. The name was popularised by Peter de Lange as 'sexy pavement lichen'.

== Description ==
Xanthoparmelia scabrosa has a thallus that is foliose (leafy in appearance). The upper surface is yellow-green, while the lower surface is pale to dark brown.

== Habitat and range ==
Xanthoparmelia scabrosa is common in Australia and New Zealand, also occurring on Norfolk Island, Papua New Guinea, Fiji, Argentina, South Africa and Japan. In New Zealand it grows abundantly on roads and footpaths, ordinarily an inhospitable environment for lichens.

== Chemistry ==
Xanthoparmelia scabrosa appears to tolerate the high levels of heavy metals present in asphalt by accumulating these in the thallus. It can also accumulate high levels of calcium. These abilities may make it useful for phytoremediation.

== Medical use ==
Xanthoparmelia scabrosa has been marketed as a treatment for erectile dysfunction, but many scientists do not recommend this use. While the lichen contains a PDE5 inhibitor, which may inhibit an enzyme responsible for impotence, the same substance may itself be toxic. The lichen is also high in toxic heavy metals.

== See also ==
- List of Xanthoparmelia species
