= Xanthoparmelia aliphatica =

Scientific classification
- Kingdom: Fungi
- Division: Ascomycota
- Class: Lecanoromycetes
- Order: Lecanorales
- Family: Parmeliaceae
- Genus: Xanthoparmelia
- Species: X. aliphatica

Binomial name
- Xanthoparmelia aliphatica Hale (1986)

Species of lichen-forming fungus

Xanthoparmelia aliphatica is a species of saxicolous (rock-dwelling), foliose lichen in the family Parmeliaceae. Found in South Africa, it was formally described as a new species in 1986 by the American lichenologist Mason Hale. The type specimen was collected from the Cape Province at an elevation of about 900 m (3,000 ft); there, it was found growing on granitic outcrops in karoo habitat. The lichen contains the secondary metabolites (lichen products) constipatic acid, various associated fatty acids, and usnic acid. The black undersurface of the thallus is an unusual trait for fatty acid-containing Xanthoparmelia species.

== See also ==
- List of Xanthoparmelia species
