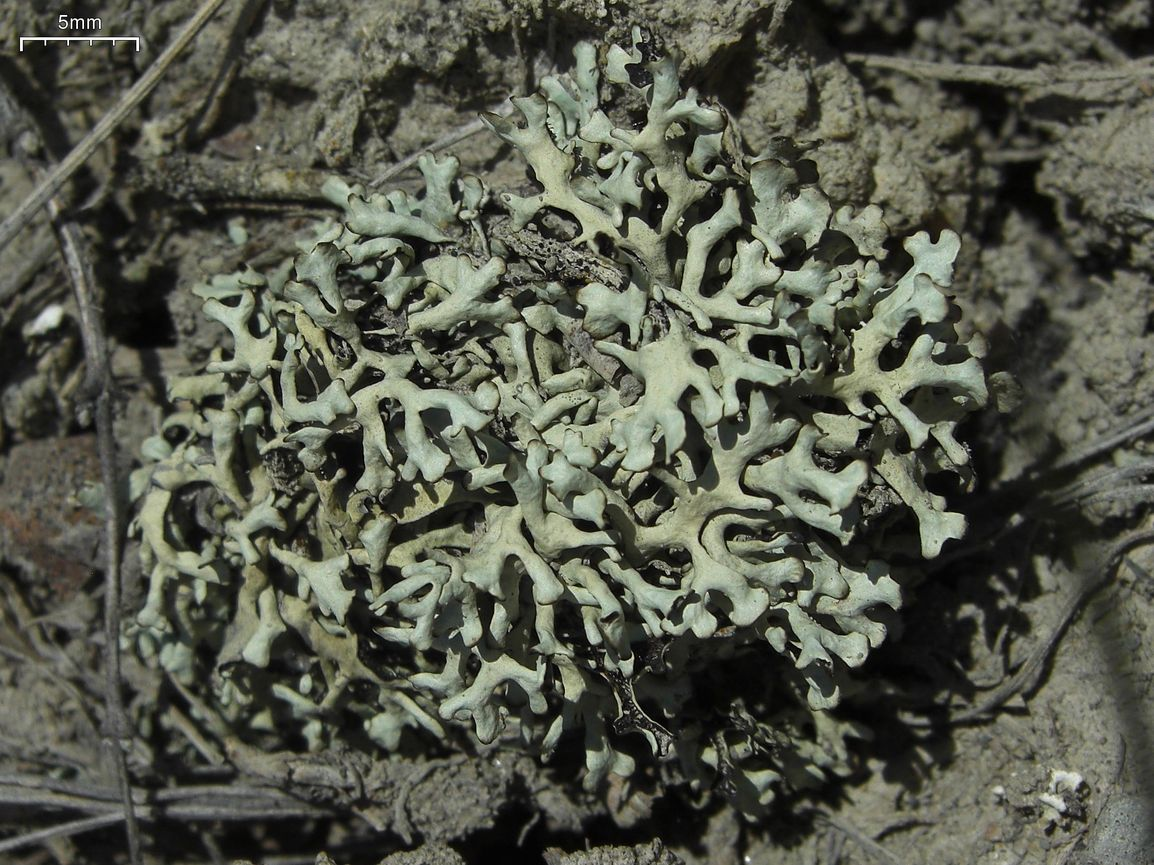

Conservation status
- Apparently Secure (NatureServe)

Scientific classification
- Kingdom: Fungi
- Division: Ascomycota
- Class: Lecanoromycetes
- Order: Lecanorales
- Family: Parmeliaceae
- Genus: Xanthoparmelia
- Species: X. wyomingica

Binomial name
- Xanthoparmelia wyomingica (Gyeln.) Hale (1974)

Synonyms
- Parmelia digitulata var. wyomingica Gyeln. (1938)

= Xanthoparmelia wyomingica =

Species of lichen found globally

Xanthoparmelia wyomingica is a foliose lichen that belongs to the genus Xanthoparmelia.

== Description ==
The lichen grows to around 4-8 cm in diameter with irregularly lobate lobes which are approximately 1-3 mm wide. The upper surface of the lichen is yellow-green with a smooth and shiny surface while the lower surface is often pale or dark brown in color.

== Habitat and range ==
The lichen is found in North America and was first isolated in the US State of Wyoming which it was named after. Wyoming is the southernmost extent of this lichen with its northernmost extent being the Northwest Territories in Canada.

== See also ==
- List of Xanthoparmelia species
