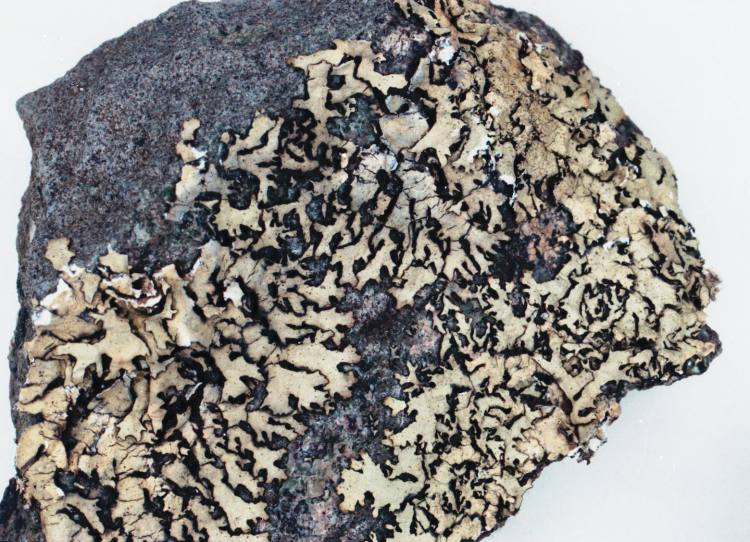

Conservation status
- Secure (NatureServe)

Scientific classification
- Kingdom: Fungi
- Division: Ascomycota
- Class: Lecanoromycetes
- Order: Lecanorales
- Family: Parmeliaceae
- Genus: Xanthoparmelia
- Species: X. angustiphylla

Binomial name
- Xanthoparmelia angustiphylla (Gyeln.) Hale (1988)

Synonyms
- Parmelia conspersa var. angustiphylla Gyeln. (1931)

= Xanthoparmelia angustiphylla =

Species of lichen found in the United States

Xanthoparmelia angustiphylla is a foliose lichen that belongs to the genus Xanthoparmelia.

== Description ==
Xanthoparmelia angustiphylla grows to around 5–10 cm in diameter with regular to irregular rosettes that become more irregular over time. The upper surface is yellow-green and the lower surface is black with simple rhizines that are approximately 0.2–0.8 mm long.

== Habitat and range ==
Xanthoparmelia angustiphylla is found mostly in North America, with limited observations in Australia and Europe.

== Chemistry ==
Xanthoparmelia angustiphylla is known to contain menegazziaic acid and usnic acid.

== See also ==
- List of Xanthoparmelia species
