= Xanthoparmelia colensoica =

Scientific classification
- Kingdom: Fungi
- Division: Ascomycota
- Class: Lecanoromycetes
- Order: Lecanorales
- Family: Parmeliaceae
- Genus: Xanthoparmelia
- Species: X. colensoica

Binomial name
- Xanthoparmelia colensoica T.H.Nash, Elix & J.Johnst. (1988)
- Holotype: Bainskloof Pass, Cape Province, South Africa

Synonyms
- Parmelia colensoica (T.H.Nash, Elix & J.Johnst.) Brusse (1989)

Species of lichen-forming fungus

Xanthoparmelia colensoica is a species of lichen in the family Parmeliaceae. The species was first described in 1988 from specimens collected on acidic rock at Bainskloof Pass in South Africa's Cape Province. It forms small, firmly attached patches 1 to 2 centimetres across that are yellow-green when young but darken to greyish black with age. The lichen is distinguished by its secondary chemistry, particularly the presence of colensoic acid together with several related compounds.

== Taxonomy ==
Xanthoparmelia colensoica was described as a new species by Thomas Hawkes Nash, John Elix and Jen Johnston in their 1988 treatment of the Xanthoparmelia stenosporonica group. The authors characterised it as having a thallus that is essentially like that of X. stenosporonica, but differing in its secondary chemistry.

The type specimen was collected on acidic rock at Bainskloof Pass in the Cape Province of South Africa at about 600 m elevation, on 20 January 1986, by T.H. Nash (collection number 23,505). The holotype is housed at Arizona State University (ASU). In their discussion the authors compared X. colensoica particularly with X. stenosporonica and X. shebaensis: all three belong to the same chemosyndrome, but X. colensoica differs in lacking the additional "chemical combinants" present in X. stenosporonica, and from X. shebaensis in its less clearly foliose thallus, which lacks the reticulate maculae seen in that species.

== Description ==
The thallus of Xanthoparmelia colensoica is small-foliose to almost crustose and firmly attached to the rock surface. Individual thalli are usually 1–2 cm across and are yellow-green when young, darkening with age until they appear greyish black. The lobes are somewhat irregular to narrowly elongate, about 0.5–1.0 mm wide (occasionally as narrow as 0.2 mm), and branch irregularly to subdichotomously. They may overlap or remain more or less separate, and in older parts of the thallus the surface becomes cracked and broken into small areoles, especially towards the centre.

The upper surface is smooth and lacks pustules or other maculae; it is shiny with a thin black marginal line near the lobe tips but becomes dull towards the interior. No vegetative propagules such as soredia or isidia were observed. The medulla is white. The lower surface is flat, black and moderately densely covered with rhizines; these attachment structures are themselves black, simple or in small tufts, and about 0.1–0.2 mm long. Sexual and asexual fruiting bodies (apothecia and pycnidia, respectively) were not seen in the type material. Chemically, the cortex reacts K+ (yellow), while the medulla is K−, C−, KC− and P− in spot tests. The secondary metabolites detected include usnic acid, major amounts of colensoic acid, and minor or trace amounts of norcolensoic, stenosporonic, lividic, physodic and oxyphysodic acids, together with an unidentified component.

== Habitat and distribution ==
Xanthoparmelia colensoica is a rock-dwelling lichen that grows on acidic rocks. The type collection was made on such substrates at Bainskloof Pass in the Cape Province of South Africa at an elevation of about 600 m. It was later collected on Table Mountain, about 80 km south of the type locality.

== See also ==
- List of Xanthoparmelia species
