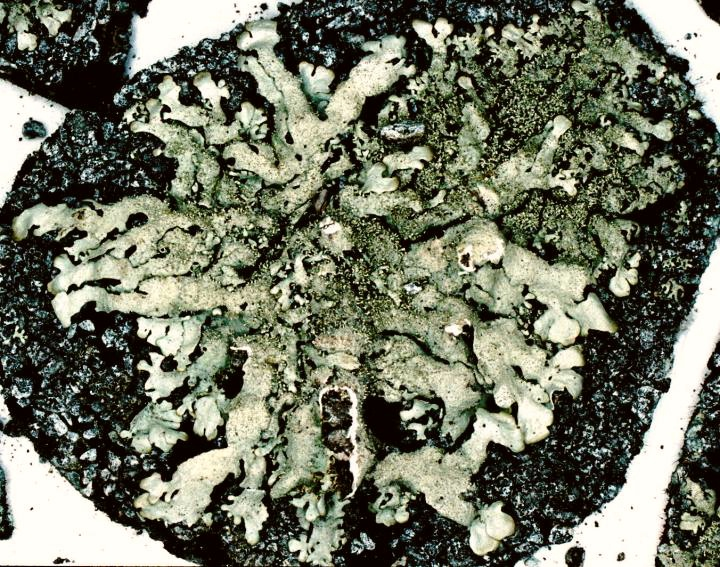

Conservation status
- Secure (NatureServe)

- Least Concern (IUCN 3.1)

Scientific classification
- Kingdom: Fungi
- Division: Ascomycota
- Class: Lecanoromycetes
- Order: Lecanorales
- Family: Parmeliaceae
- Genus: Xanthoparmelia
- Species: X. subramigera

Binomial name
- Xanthoparmelia subramigera (Gyeln.) Hale (1974)

Synonyms
- Parmelia subramigera Gyeln. (1931)

= Xanthoparmelia subramigera =

Species of lichen found globally

Xanthoparmelia subramigera is a lichen which belongs to the Xanthoparmelia genus.

== Description ==
This lichen grows to around 4-12 cm in diameter, with irregularly lobate lobes which are approximately 1.5-4 mm wide. The upper surface of the lichen is yellow-green, smooth, and shiny, while the lower surface is often pale or medium brown in color.

== Habitat and range ==
The lichen has a wide global range, including Africa, North and South America, the Caribbean, Japan, and Oceania. This species can be found in very isolated locations such as Ascension Island and St Helena Island in the Atlantic Ocean, and the mountains of North Korea.

== See also ==
- List of Xanthoparmelia species
