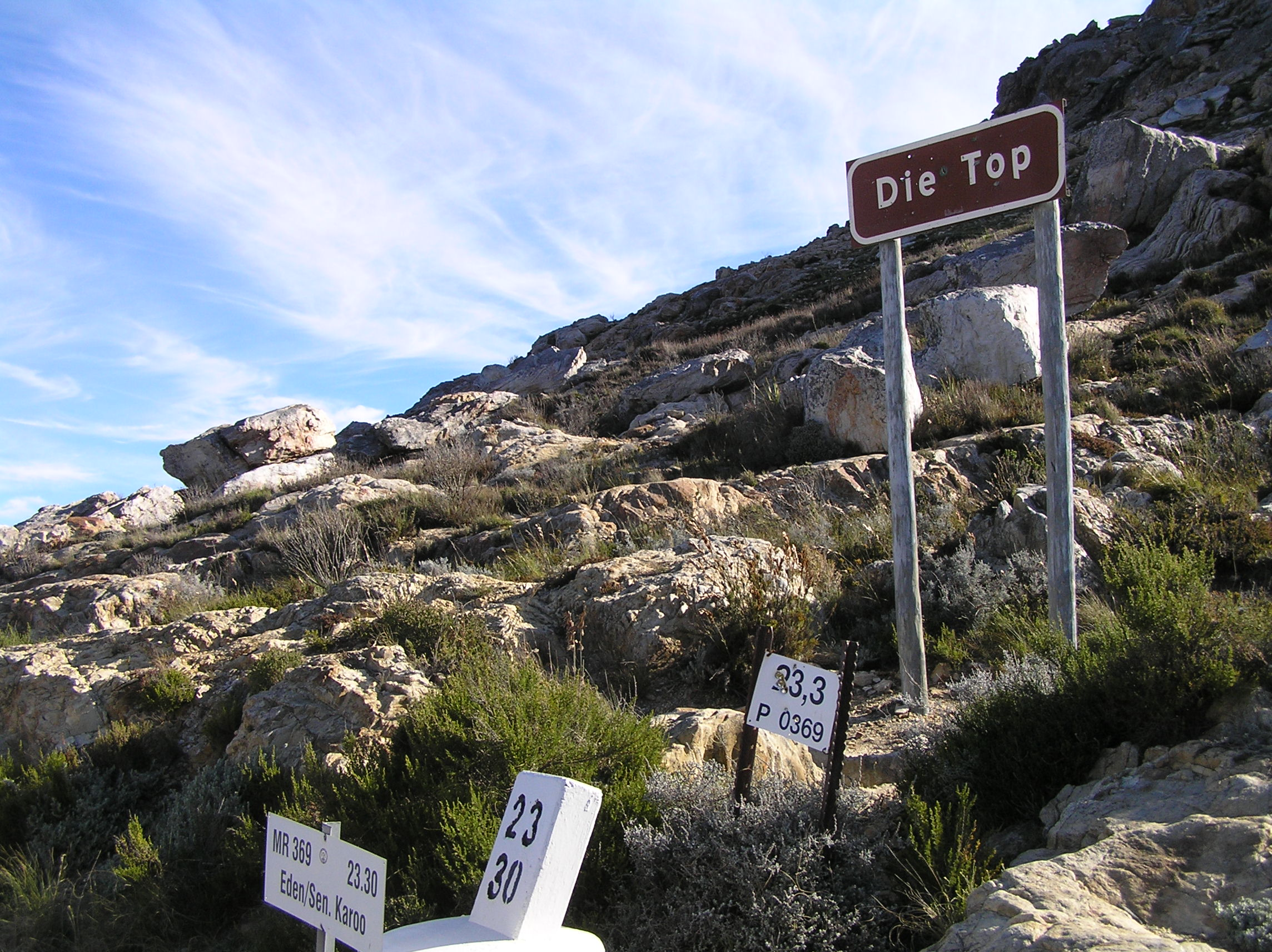
- General habitat of type specimen

Scientific classification
- Kingdom: Fungi
- Division: Ascomycota
- Class: Lecanoromycetes
- Order: Lecanorales
- Family: Parmeliaceae
- Genus: Xanthoparmelia
- Species: X. stenosporonica

Binomial name
- Xanthoparmelia stenosporonica Hale (1986)

= Xanthoparmelia stenosporonica =

Species of lichen

Xanthoparmelia stenosporonica is a species of saxicolous (rock-dwelling), foliose lichen in the family Parmeliaceae. Found in South Africa, it was formally described as a new species in 1986 by the American lichenologist Mason Hale. The type specimen was collected from the summit of Swartberg Pass (southwestern Cape Province) at an elevation of 1,585 m (5,200 ft). The lichen thallus, which Hale described as "inconspicuous", is tightly attached to its rock substrate, has a light yellowish brown color, and measures 1–2 cm (0.4–0.8 in) in diameter. It contains stenosporic acid (for which it is named), colensoic acid, and usnic acid.

== See also ==
- List of Xanthoparmelia species
