= Punctelia negata =

Scientific classification
- Kingdom: Fungi
- Division: Ascomycota
- Class: Lecanoromycetes
- Order: Lecanorales
- Family: Parmeliaceae
- Genus: Punctelia
- Species: P. negata

Binomial name
- Punctelia negata (Nyl.) Krog (1982)

Synonyms
- Parmelia negata Nyl. (1872)

Species of lichen

Punctelia negata is a little-known species of foliose lichen in the family Parmeliaceae. It is found in South America.

== Taxonomy ==
The lichen was described as a new species by Finnish lichenologist William Nylander in 1872. Giving a brief diagnosis in a footnote, he distinguished it from the similar species P. rudecta and P. borreri by its longer ascospores and conidia, and its more wrinkled amphithecia (the inner layer of the perithecium next to the hymenium). The original specimens were collected by Alexander Lindig in "Nova Granata" (i.e. [= Republic of New Granada], specifically Bogotá, Colombia), at an altitude of 2,600 m (8,500 ft). In 1982, Norwegian botanist Hildur Krog transferred the taxon to the newly circumscribed Punctelia, a segregate genus from Parmelia created to contain species with rounded pseudocyphellae.

The lichen is not well understood and has rarely been gathered since it was described. Specimens reportedly collected from Rio Grande do Sul and from Paraná in 1999 and 2001 were examined later and determined to have been misidentified, representing instead the species Punctelia borrerina. Consequently, the only verified material of Punctelia negata is the holotype and isotypes collected from the type locality in Colombia.

== Description ==
Major characteristics of Punctelia negata include the presence of small lobes (lobules) on the upper thallus surface, a pale brown lower thallus surface, long threadlike (filiform) conidia, ascospores measuring 19–23 μm long, and a medulla that reacts C− in a lichen spot test.

A high-pressure liquid chromatography analysis of the type specimen revealed several secondary chemicals, including protoconstipatic acid and constipatic acid as major products, and dehydroconstipatic acid, protodehydroconstipatic acid, atranorin, and chloroatranorin as minor products.
