= Xanthoparmelia arida =

Conservation status
- Apparently Secure (NatureServe)

Scientific classification
- Kingdom: Fungi
- Division: Ascomycota
- Class: Lecanoromycetes
- Order: Lecanorales
- Family: Parmeliaceae
- Genus: Xanthoparmelia
- Species: X. arida

Binomial name
- Xanthoparmelia arida Egan & Derstine (1979)

Species of lichen found in the USA and Mexico

Xanthoparmelia arida is a lichen which belongs to the Xanthoparmelia genus. It is an arid shield lichen, and is uncommon. It is listed as apparently secure by the Nature Conservatory. It is noted for being similar to Xanthoparmelia joranadia.

== Description ==
This lichen grows to around 3–8 cm in diameter, with broad, dull, yellow-green, sub-irregular lobes that extend 1–3 mm wide. The underside is pale brown with simple rhizines approximately 0.3-0.6 mm long.

== Habitat and range ==
It is found in the North American southwest, particularly in the state of Texas.

== Chemistry ==
Xanthoparmelia arida has been recorded as containing both lecanoric and usnic acids.

== See also ==
- List of Xanthoparmelia species
