= Xanthoparmelia metastrigosa =

Conservation status
- Endangered (NSWBCA)

Scientific classification
- Kingdom: Fungi
- Division: Ascomycota
- Class: Lecanoromycetes
- Order: Lecanorales
- Family: Parmeliaceae
- Genus: Xanthoparmelia
- Species: X. metastrigosa

Binomial name
- Xanthoparmelia metastrigosa (Elix) Hale

Species of lichen found in Australia

Xanthoparmelia metastrigosa is a lichen which belongs to the Xanthoparmelia genus. It is found only in Australia. It is one of the few lichens that is listed as endangered.

== Description ==
This lichen grows to around 7–12 cm in diameter, with irregular and dichotomously branched lobes. The upper surface of the lichen is yellow-green.

== Habitat and range ==
Xanthoparmelia canobolasensis and Xanthoparmelia metastrigosa are known only from Mount Canobolas.

== See also ==
- List of Xanthoparmelia species
