= Xanthoparmelia maricopensis =

Conservation status
- Vulnerable (NatureServe)

Scientific classification
- Kingdom: Fungi
- Division: Ascomycota
- Class: Lecanoromycetes
- Order: Lecanorales
- Family: Parmeliaceae
- Genus: Xanthoparmelia
- Species: X. maricopensis

Binomial name
- Xanthoparmelia maricopensis T.H.Nash & Elix (1986)

Species of lichen

Xanthoparmelia maricopensis, the Maricopa rock-shield, is a 2–6 cm (0.8–2.4 in) wide, yellow-green foliose lichen in the Parmeliaceae family. It grows on igneous rock in southwestern North American deserts.

== Description ==
The thallus is tightly attached to the substrate, with irregular somewhat shiny 1–2 mm lobes. It differs from Xanthoparmelis dierythra in that it has hyposalazinic acid and the lobes are usually more narrow and convex. The lower surface is tan and has unbranched rhizenes.

=== Metabolites ===
The upper cortex is K−, C−, KC−, and P−. The medulla is K+ yellow to orange, C−, KC−, P+ orange. The upper cortex has usnic acid as a secondary metabolite. The medulla has norstictic acid and traces of hyposalazinic acid and connorstictic acid.

== Distribution and habitat ==
It is common in lower elevations of the Sonoran Desert in Arizona, southern California, and north and south Baja California to Chihuahua, Mexico and Sonora Mexico. In Joshua Tree National Park it grows on non-calcareous rock, soil, basalt, gneiss, and monzogranite.

== See also ==
- List of Xanthoparmelia species
