= Xanthoparmelia pokornyi =

Scientific classification
- Domain: Eukaryota
- Kingdom: Fungi
- Division: Ascomycota
- Class: Lecanoromycetes
- Order: Lecanorales
- Family: Parmeliaceae
- Genus: Xanthoparmelia
- Species: X. pokornyi

Binomial name
- Xanthoparmelia pokornyi (Körb.) O.Blanco, A.Crespo, Elix, D.Hawksw. & Lumbsch (2004)

Synonyms
- Imbricaria pokornyi Körb. (1860); Neofuscelia pokornyi (Körb.) Essl. (1978); Neofuscelia pulla var. pokornyi (Körb.) P.Scholz (2000); Parmelia pulla var. pokornyi (Körb.) Poelt & Vězda (1981); Parmelia ryssolea var. pokornyi (Körb.) H.Olivier (1907); Xanthoparmelia pulla var. pokornyi (Körb.) S.Y.Kondr.

Species of lichen

Xanthoparmelia pokornyi is a lichen species in the family Parmeliaceae. It contains the depsides gyrophoric acid and stenosporic acid.

== See also ==
- List of Xanthoparmelia species
