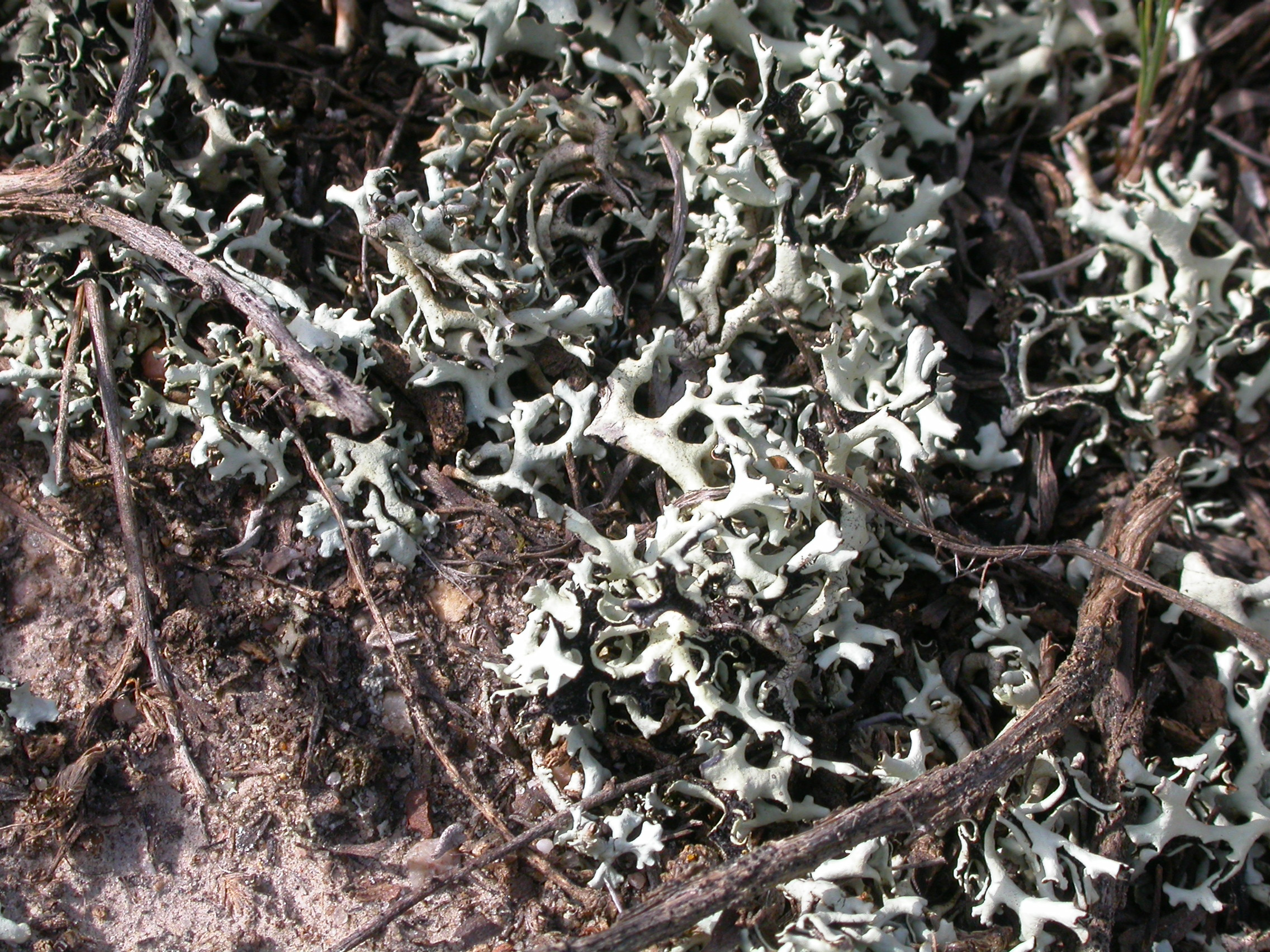
- In Bozeman, Montana

Conservation status
- Secure (NatureServe)

Scientific classification
- Kingdom: Fungi
- Division: Ascomycota
- Class: Lecanoromycetes
- Order: Lecanorales
- Family: Parmeliaceae
- Genus: Xanthoparmelia
- Species: X. chlorochroa

Binomial name
- Xanthoparmelia chlorochroa (Tuck.) Hale (1974)

Synonyms
- Parmelia chlorochroa Tuck. (1860)

= Xanthoparmelia chlorochroa =

Species of lichen

Xanthoparmelia chlorochroa, known as the tumbleweed shield lichen or ground lichen, is a foliose lichen in the Parmeliaceae family. It is not fixed to a substrate, and blows around in the wind from location to location.

== Distribution and habitat ==
This lichen is abundant on the High Plains of Wyoming. Its distribution covers intermountain regions of western North America, and Mexico.

== Physiology ==
Xanthoparmelia chlorochroa demonstrates distinct patterns in how it manages water content, which is crucial for its survival and growth. Research has shown that this lichen can hold water content ranging from 0% to over 100% of its dry weight, with optimal physiological activity occurring above 40% water content. When completely saturated, the lichen can develop surface water films that significantly affect its water retention capabilities. Studies using impedance measurement techniques (which measure the resistance to electrical current flow) have revealed that X. chlorochroa responds differently to water content at various hydration levels. The lichen shows particularly sensitive responses both when it has surface water present and when it begins to dry out below 40% water content. This water management system allows X. chlorochroa to rapidly respond to available moisture in its often dry grassland habitat, while also helping it maintain metabolic activity during periods of limited water availability.

== Uses ==
Tumbleweed shield lichen is used as a dye by Navajo rug weavers. It has been used as a remedy for impetigo by the Navajo.

== Toxicity ==
It was implicated in the poisoning of domestic sheep and cattle in Wyoming during the 1930s. It has also been implicated in the poisoning of elk in 2004.

== See also ==
- List of Xanthoparmelia species
