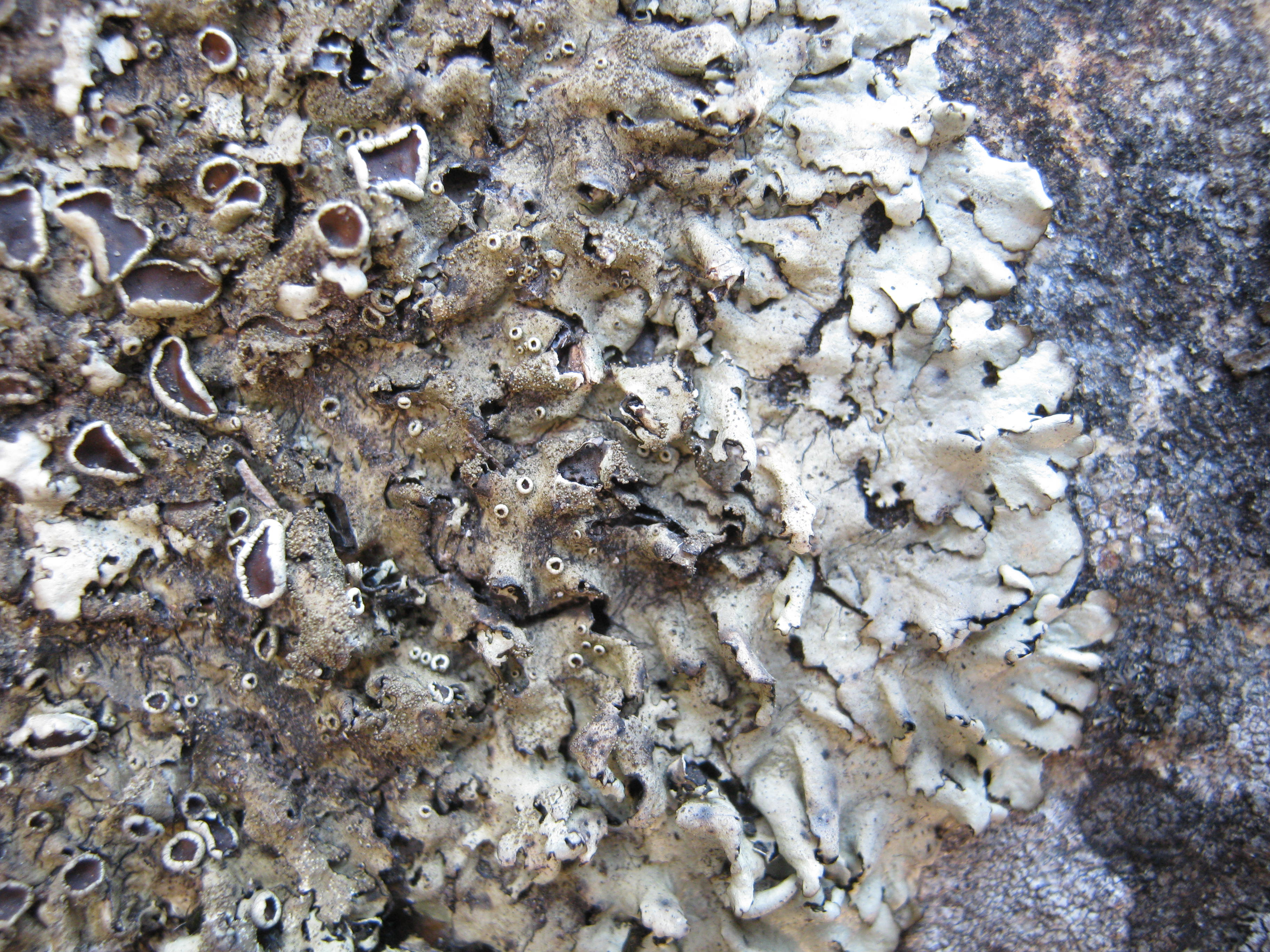

Conservation status
- Secure (NatureServe)

Scientific classification
- Kingdom: Fungi
- Division: Ascomycota
- Class: Lecanoromycetes
- Order: Lecanorales
- Family: Parmeliaceae
- Genus: Xanthoparmelia
- Species: X. tinctina

Binomial name
- Xanthoparmelia tinctina (Maheu & A.Gillet) Hale (1974)

Synonyms
- Parmelia tinctina Maheu & A.Gillet (1925); Parmelia conspersa subsp. tinctina (Maheu & A.Gillet) Clauzade & Cl.Roux (1985)

= Xanthoparmelia tinctina =

Species of lichen

Xanthoparmelia tinctina is a species of foliose lichen from the family Parmeliaceae that can be found in Arizona, California, Northern Africa and Europe. The upper surface is yellow–green, while the bottom surface is brown and flat, measuring 0.2–0.6 millimetres (0.0079–0.0236 in) in diameter. The apothecia are 2–10 millimetres (0.08–0.39 in) wide, the thallus is laminal and is 3–10 centimetres (1–4 in) in diameter. The disc is either cinnamon-brown or dark brown and is ellipsoided. The pycnidia are immersed, and the conidia are bifusiform, with eight-spored asci that are hyaline and ellipsoid.

Xanthoparmelia tinctina can colonize serpentinite rocks, including asbestos-bearing surfaces. Studies from the Balangero asbestos mine in northwestern Italy have shown that while the species commonly grows on natural serpentinite outcrops in the region, it shows limited colonization of exposed mine walls. When transplanted to asbestos-rich surfaces, adult thalli of X. tinctina can survive and grow, though their growth rates are affected by substrate instability and erosion. Research has demonstrated that thalli directly adhered to mine surfaces showed variable growth patterns over time, with some specimens achieving up to 29% annual area increase despite challenging conditions. The species reproduces through isidia, though laboratory and field studies indicate these reproductive structures have limited success establishing on unstable mine surfaces.

== See also ==
- List of Xanthoparmelia species
