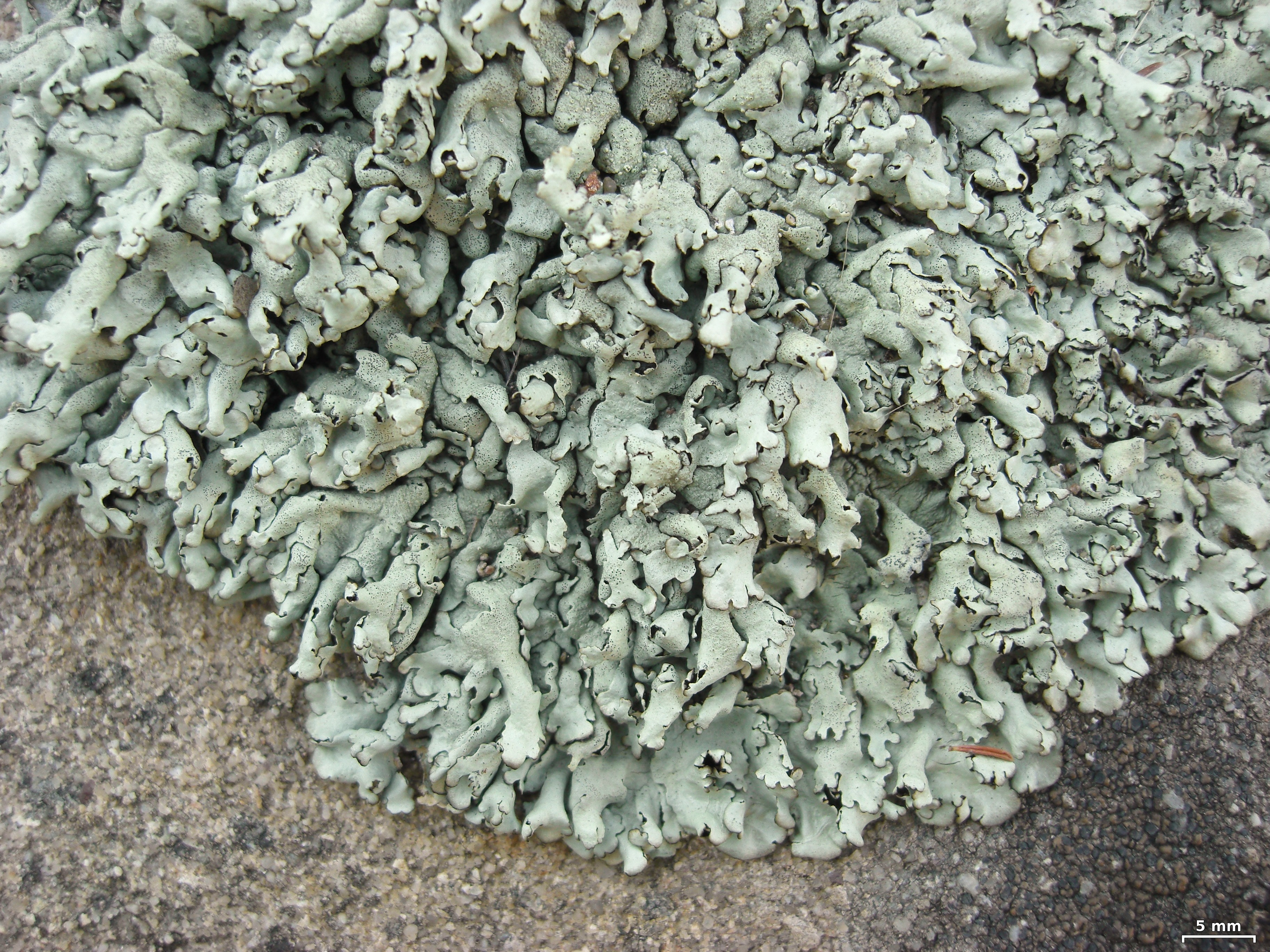

Conservation status
- Secure (NatureServe)

Scientific classification
- Kingdom: Fungi
- Division: Ascomycota
- Class: Lecanoromycetes
- Order: Lecanorales
- Family: Parmeliaceae
- Genus: Xanthoparmelia
- Species: X. cumberlandia

Binomial name
- Xanthoparmelia cumberlandia (Gyeln.) Hale (1974)

Synonyms
- Parmelia cumberlandia Gyeln.

= Xanthoparmelia cumberlandia =

Species of lichen found in North America

Xanthoparmelia cumberlandia is a lichen which belongs to the Xanthoparmelia genus. It is also known as a member of the rockfrong lichens due to its coloration.

== Description ==
This lichen grows to around 6–12 cm in diameter with irregular lobate lobes. The upper surface of the lichen has rounded lobed tips with yellow-green or blueish green areas on the surface.

== Habitat and range ==
It is commonly found attached to acid rocks in sheltered and semi-sheltered open coastal and intermontane areas at lower elevations. As such, it is commonly found in across North America, except in deserts and open plains.

== Chemistry ==
Xanthoparmelia cumberlandia produces constictic, norstictic, stictic, norstictic, usnic and menegazzic acids.

== Taxonomy ==
The lichen was first formally described under the name Parmelia cumberlandia in 1847.

== See also ==
- List of Xanthoparmelia species
