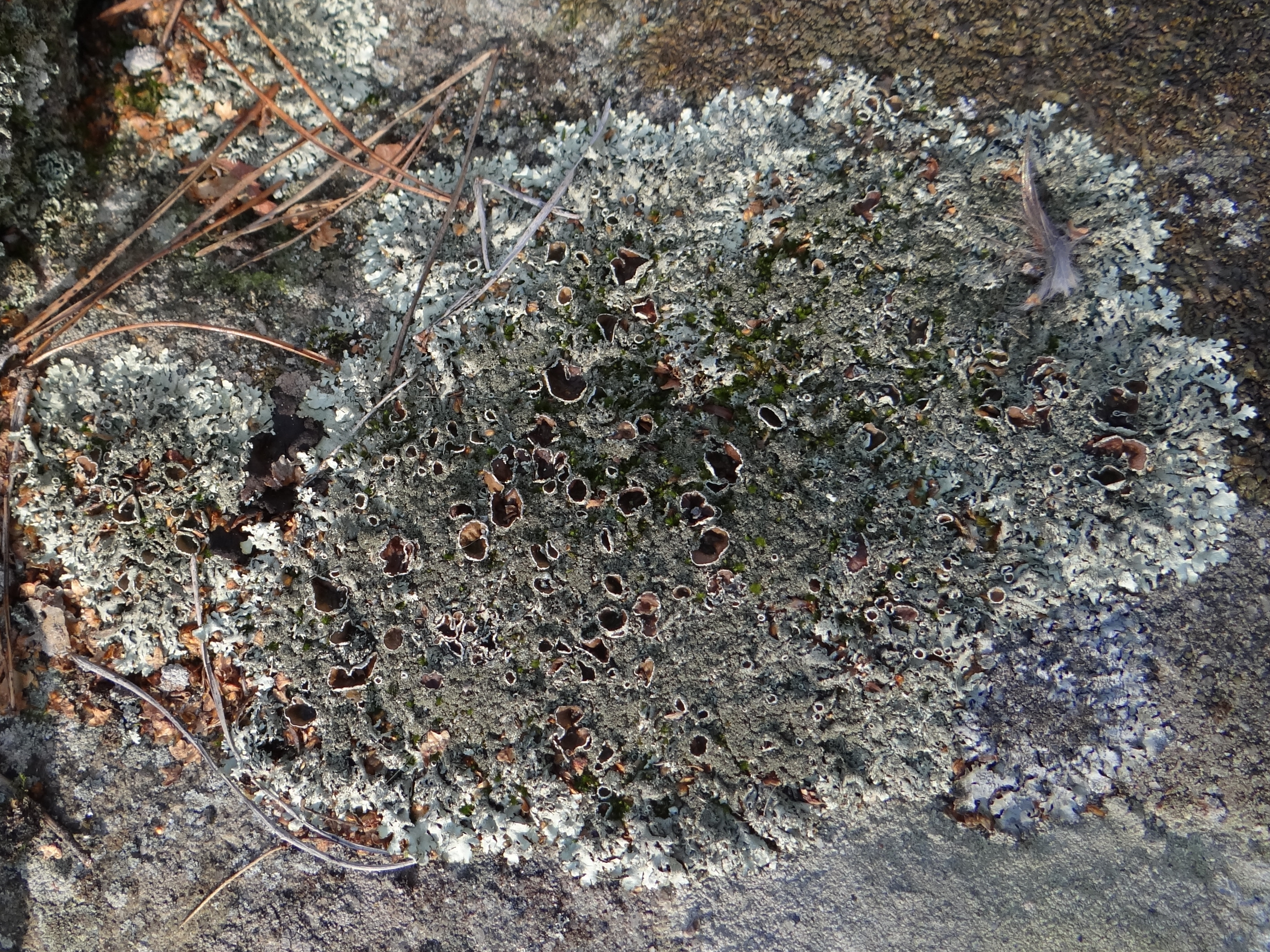

Conservation status
- Secure (NatureServe)

Scientific classification
- Kingdom: Fungi
- Division: Ascomycota
- Class: Lecanoromycetes
- Order: Lecanorales
- Family: Parmeliaceae
- Genus: Xanthoparmelia
- Species: X. conspersa

Binomial name
- Xanthoparmelia conspersa (Ehrh. ex Ach.) Hale (1974)

Synonyms
- Lichen conspersus Ehrh. ex Ach. (1805); Lobaria conspersa (Ehrh. ex Ach.) P.Gaertn., G.Mey. & Scherb. (1801); Parmelia conspersa (Ehrh. ex Ach.) Ach. (1803); Imbricaria conspersa Ehrh. ex Ach.) DC. (1805)

= Xanthoparmelia conspersa =

Species of foliose lichen in the family Parmeliaceae

Xanthoparmelia conspersa, commonly known as the peppered rock-shield, is a foliose lichen and the type species of genus Xanthoparmelia. It is widely distributed in temperate zones, and has been recorded from Japan, Europe, Africa, North America, and South America.

== Taxonomy ==
The lichen was first described with the name Lichen conspersus in 1799 by lichenologist Erik Acharius. In its taxonomic history, it has been transferred to the genera Imbricaria, Lobaria, and Parmelia. It became known as a species of Xanthoparmelia when Mason Hale promoted that subgenus of Parmelia to generic status in 1974.

It is commonly known as the "peppered rock-shield".

== Description ==
Xanthoparmelia conspersa has a thallus that is either tightly or loosely attached to its substrate. The thallus, which measures 4–12 cm (1.6–4.7 in), is made of narrow lobes that are 1–3 mm wide, which are crowded and usually overlapping. The thallus' upper surface often features isidia that range in shape from spherical to branched cylinders. The lower surface of the thallus is black, except for near the lobe tips, where it may be pale to dark brown. Rhizines are coarse, black, and simple (i.e., unbranched), with a length of 0.5–1 mm. Ascospores are 5–6 by 9–10 μm.

Some secondary metabolites found in Xanthoparmelia conspersa include usnic acid, hyposalazinic acid, stictic acid and norstictic acid.

== Habitat and distribution ==
Xanthoparmelia conspersa grows on rocks (on siliceous rocks, particularly granite), and is typically found in sunny habitats. It has been recorded from Asia (Japan), Europe, Africa, North America, and South America.

== See also ==
- List of Xanthoparmelia species
