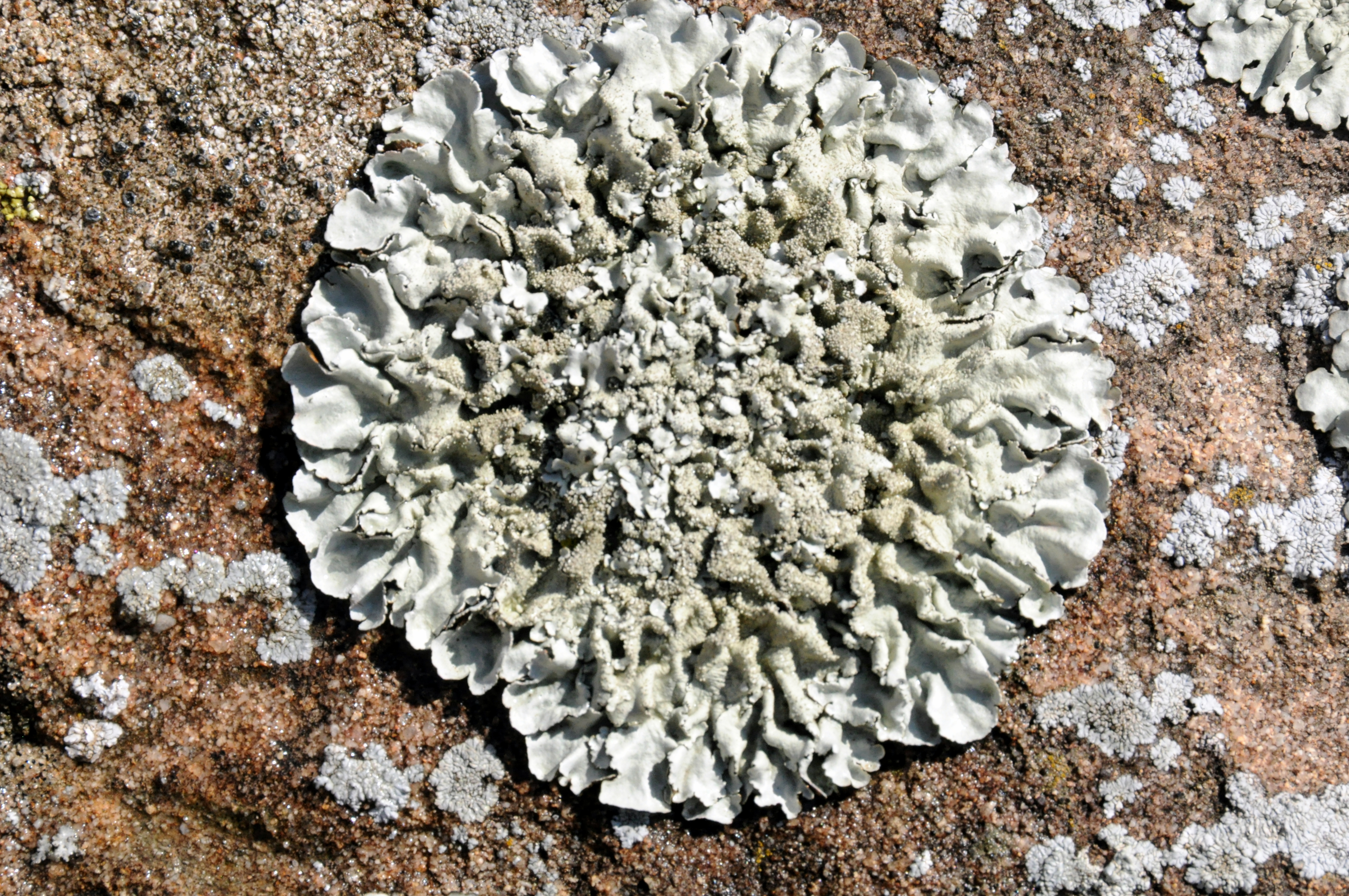

Conservation status
- Secure (NatureServe)

Scientific classification
- Kingdom: Fungi
- Division: Ascomycota
- Class: Lecanoromycetes
- Order: Lecanorales
- Family: Parmeliaceae
- Genus: Xanthoparmelia
- Species: X. mexicana

Binomial name
- Xanthoparmelia mexicana (Gyeln.) Hale (1974)

Synonyms
- Parmelia mexicana Gyeln. (1931)

= Xanthoparmelia mexicana =

Species of foliose lichen

Xanthoparmelia mexicana, commonly known as the salted rock-shield, is a foliose lichen in the family Parmeliaceae. It grows in 4–10 cm diameter rosettes of gray-green to yellow-green lobes in arid climates all over the world.

== Taxonomy ==
It was originally described in 1931 as a species of Parmelia by Hungarian lichenologist Vilmos Kőfaragó-Gyelnik. It was one of 93 species that was transferred to Xanthoparmelia when Mason Hale promoted that taxon from subgeneric to generic status in 1974. It is commonly known as the salted rock-shield.

== Description ==
Xanthoparmelia mexicana grows in 4–10 centimetres (1.6–3.9 in) diameter rosettes consisting of small lobes. The lower surface is pale to medium brown. Apothecia are uncommon; when present, they are cinnamon to dark-brown colored discs with smooth margins, and no pruina. Lichen spot tests are negative for the upper cortex (K−, C−, KC−, P−). For the medulla they are K+ yellow to dark red, C−, KC−, and P+ orange. It produces secondary metabolites including usnic acid and salazinic acid.

== Habitat and distribution ==
Xanthoparmelia mexicana grows in open and arid climates all over the world. It may loosely cling to the substrate (adnate). In the Sonoran Desert, it may be the most commonly found member of its genus. The lichen has been recorded from western North America, Mexico, the Dominican Republic, South America, Africa, Asia, Australia, and New Zealand. In Nepal, X. mexicana has been reported from 3,070 to 3,700 m elevation in a compilation of published records.

== See also ==
- List of Xanthoparmelia species
