= Constipatic acid =

Chemical compound

Names
- IUPAC name 2-(14'-hydroxypentadecyl)-4-methyl-5-oxo-2,5-dihydrofuran-3-carboxylic acid
- Other names neuropogolic acid

Identifiers
3D model (JSmol)	Interactive image
ChemSpider	8794415
PubChem CID	57459988
- InChI: InChI=1S/C21H36O5/c1-16(22)14-12-10-8-6-4-3-5-7-9-11-13-15-18-19(20(23)24)17(2)21(25)26-18/h16,18,22H,3-15H2,1-2H3,(H,23,24) Key: RJNPNSFGRBJXHX-UHFFFAOYSA-N
- SMILES: CC(O)CCCCCCCCCCCCCC1OC(=O)C(=C1C(O)=O)C

Properties
Chemical formula	C_{21}H_{36}O_{5}
Molar mass	368.514 g·mol^{−1}
Appearance	white flakes
Melting point	108–109°
- Except where otherwise noted, data are given for materials in their standard state (at 25 °C [77 °F], 100 kPa). Infobox references

Constipatic acid is a fatty acid found in several lichen species. It was isolated, identified, and named by Douglas Chester and John Alan Elix in a 1979 publication. The compound was extracted from the Australian leafy lichen called Xanthoparmelia constipata (after which the compound is named), which was collected on schist boulders west of Springton, South Australia. The related compounds protoconstipatic acid and dehydroconstipatic acid were also reported concurrently. Syo Kurokawa and Rex Filson had previously detected the compounds using thin-layer chromatography when they formally described the lichen as a new species in 1975, but had not characterised them chemically.

After conversion of constipatic acid to methyl constipatate, a mass spectra of the compound revealed four diagnostic peaks at the mass-to-charge ratio (m/e) of 367, 338, 279 and 169. The peaks correspond to the cleavage of a methyl group, the 1-hydroxyethyl moiety, the methoxycarbonyl group (i.e. CH_{3}-O-CO-) and 1-cleavage of the side chain. Additional analysis with proton nuclear magnetic resonance corroborated these results and confirmed the linear nature of the aliphatic chain.

In addition to Xanthoparmelia constipata, constipatic acid has been isolated from several other Xanthoparmelia species, including X. perezdepazii, X. filarskyana, X. flavecentireagens, X. lineola, and X. metaclystoides. It has been isolated from lichens in other genera as well. Examples include Parmelia xanthosorediata, Heterodermia appendiculata, Heterodermia japonica, Protoparmelia nebulosa, Hertelidea wankaensis, Lepraria coriensis, Punctelia negata, and Rhizoplaca melanophthalma.

Some sources consider the molecule to have an unusual or humorous name due to its similarity to the word "constipation".

== See also ==
- List of chemical compounds with unusual names
