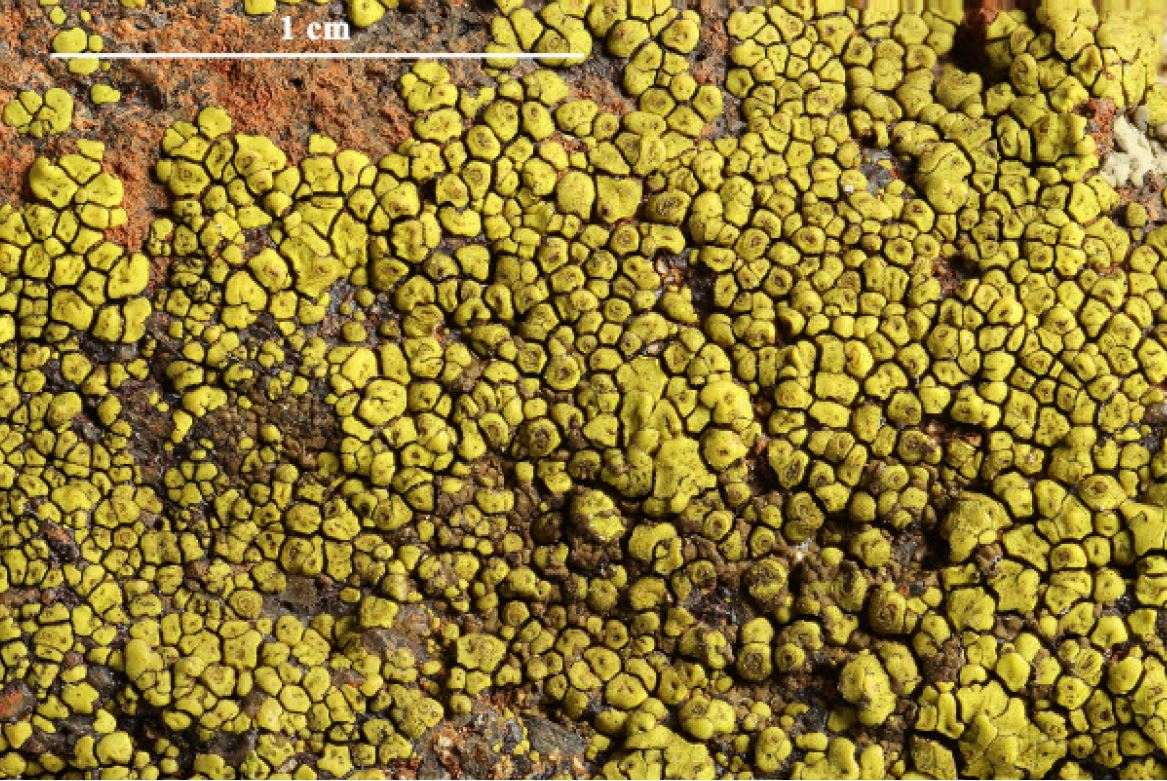

Scientific classification
- Kingdom: Fungi
- Division: Ascomycota
- Class: Lecanoromycetes
- Order: Acarosporales
- Family: Acarosporaceae
- Genus: Acarospora
- Species: A. citrina

Binomial name
- Acarospora citrina (Taylor) Zahlbr. ex Rech.

Synonyms
- Urceolaria citrina Taylor (1847); Placodium citrinum (Taylor) Müll.Arg. (1888); Acarospora wilsonii H.Magn. (1929); Acarospora schleicheri (Ach.) A.Massal. (1852); Acarospora initialis H.Magn. (1929)

= Acarospora citrina =

Species of lichen

Acarospora citrina is a lichen in the family, Acarosporaceae, first described as Urceolaria citrina by Thomas Taylor in 1847. It was assigned to the genus, Acarospora, in 1913 by Alexander Zahlbruckner.

This lichen has been found in all mainland states of Australia, on rocks in sclerophyll woodland.
