= Vilmos Kőfaragó-Gyelnik =

Hungarian lichenologist (1906–1945)

Vilmos Kőfaragó-Gyelnik (March 30, 1906 – March 15, 1945) was a Hungarian botanist and lichenologist.

Prior to earning his PhD in 1929 from Budapest University, he spent a year in Cairo to help organize a botanical museum. In 1930 he started work at Hungarian National Museum, where he curated the lichen collections. Gyelnik married Theresa Hofflinger on 30 May 1930, with whom he had a son in 1932. Gyelnik maintained a friendly correspondence with American amateur lichenologist Charles Christian Plitt for several years until Plitt's death in 1933. In the 1930s, it was common for Hungarians with non-Hungarian sounding names to alter them if they desired political appointments. Gyelnik prefixed Kőfaragó (meaning "stone-cutter") to his name in 1935, and eventually became the head of the Botanical Department of the museum in 1942. On March 15, 1945, Gyelnik was killed in Austria by Allied bombing.

Gyelnik published about 100 papers on lichens in the period 1926 to 1945, and proposed hundreds of new names, particularly in the genera Alectoria, Nephroma, Parmelia, and Peltigera. He described about 1300 new taxa, including 264 new species. His work, however, was not without detractors, who thought he published too hastily, and sometimes forgot what he had published earlier. According to Mason Hale, Gyelnik "infuriated or at least antagonized virtually every contemporary lichenologist". Ana Crespo and colleagues expressed a similar sentiment: "He was generally viewed as something of a nomenclatural terrorist by his contemporaries who were infuriated by the large numbers of novel taxa he described, most of which they could not accept, and an apparent slackness in how he worked". However, Hale also noted his deep understanding of the genus Xanthoparmelia and suggested that he was ahead of his time for using chemical tests and various morphological characters in devising his own classification system for European parmelioid lichens – some of which were used to define genera many decades later. Between 1933 and 1937 Kőfaragó-Gyelnik edited and distributed three exsiccatae.

Gyelnik is honoured in the name of the species Verrucaria gyelnikii Servít (1939), Polyblastia gyelnikiana Servít (1946), Thelidium gyelnikii Servít (1946), Parmelia gyelnikii C.W.Dodge (1959), and Psorotichia gyelnikii S.Y. Kondr., Lőkös & Hur (2016).

== See also ==
- Category:Taxa named by Vilmos Kőfaragó-Gyelnik
- List of Hungarian botanists
