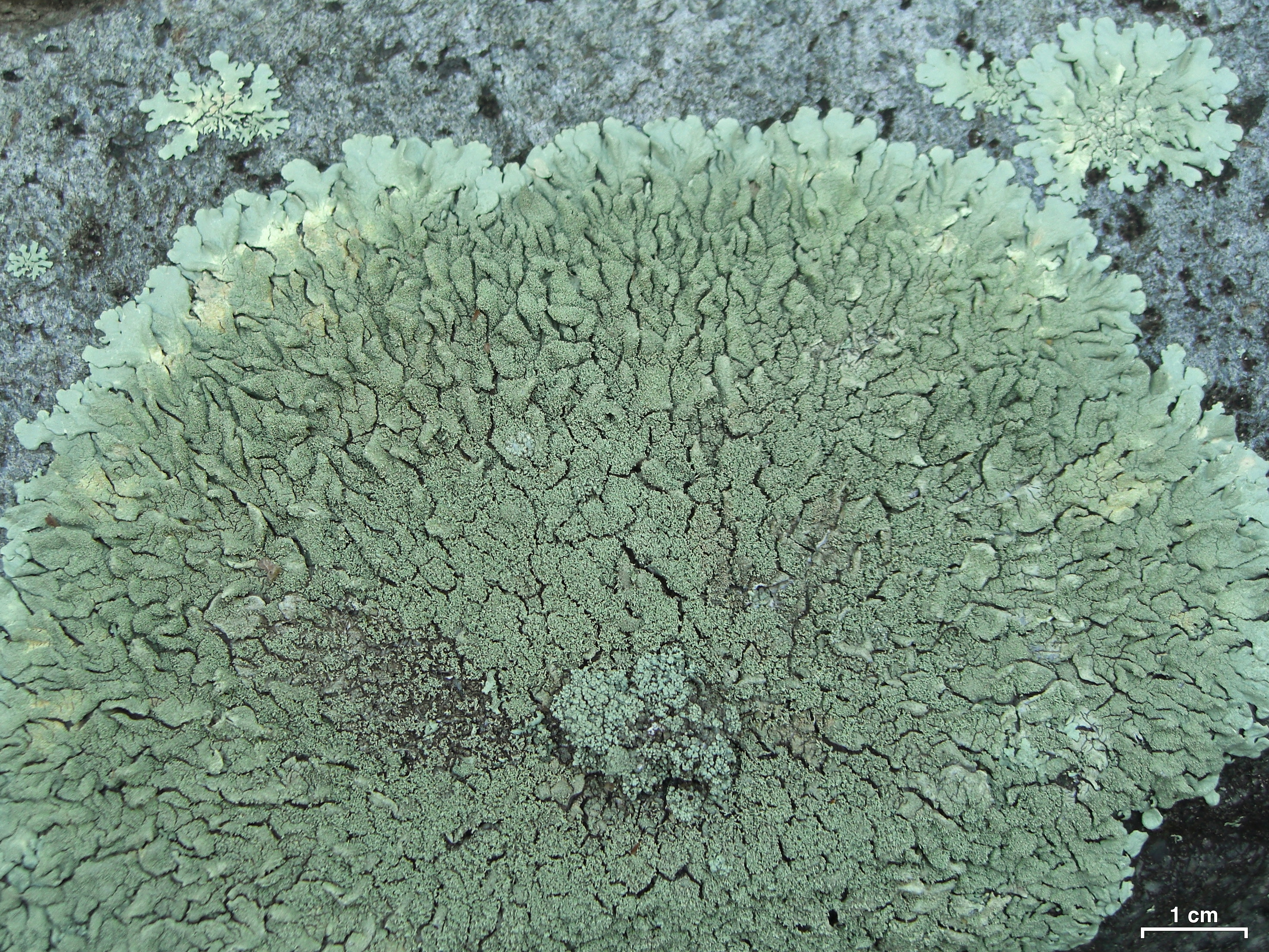
- Xanthoparmelia conspersa

Scientific classification
- Kingdom: Fungi
- Division: Ascomycota
- Class: Lecanoromycetes
- Order: Lecanorales
- Family: Parmeliaceae
- Genus: Xanthoparmelia (Vain.) Hale (1974)

Type species
- Xanthoparmelia conspersa (Ehrh. ex Ach.) Hale (1974)

Synonyms
- List: Parmelia sect. Xanthoparmelia Vain. (1890); Almbornia Essl. (1981); Chondropsis Nyl. (1869); Chondropsis Nyl. ex Cromb. (1879); Karoowia Hale (1989); Namakwa Hale (1988); Neofuscelia Essl. (1978); Omphalodiella Henssen (1991); Parmelia sect. Xanthoparmelia Vain. (1890); Paraparmelia Elix & J.Johnst. (1986); Placoparmelia Henssen (1992); Xanthomaculina Hale (1985)

= Xanthoparmelia =

Genus of fungi

Xanthoparmelia (commonly known as green rock shields or rock-shield lichens) is a genus of foliose lichens in the family Parmeliaceae. This genus of lichen is commonly found in the United States, South America, southern Africa, Europe, Australia, and New Zealand.

The name means 'golden yellow parmelia'. The photobiont (photosynthetic partner) is Trebouxia (a genus of green algae).

== Taxonomy ==
Xanthoparmelia was originally conceived of as a section of the genus Parmelia by Brazilian lichenologist Edvard August Vainio in 1890, to accommodate yellow species with narrow lobes. Mason Hale considered that the combination of traits including the presence of the cortical pigment usnic acid, and the microscopic structure of the upper cortex were sufficient criteria to segregate Xanthoparmelia from the genus Parmelia. He formally transferred 93 species, including the type, Xanthoparmelia conspersa.

In a 2004 study, molecular analysis was used to help revise the classification of parmelioid lichens containing Xanthoparmelia-type lichenan. This analysis demonstrated that several genera previously segregated from Xanthoparmelia on the basis of physical characteristics did not form distinct clades within Xanthoparmelia, and so Neofuscelia, Chondropsis and Paraparmelia were synonymized with Xanthoparmelia. As a result of this work, 10 new species were published, and 129 new combinations into Xanthoparmelia were proposed. Similarly, three South African genera, Almbornia, Namakwa, and Xanthomaculina, were synonymized with Xanthoparmelia after the limits of the genus were further explored and refined with molecular phylogenetics. Karoowia, a genus that was characterized by features such as its subcrustose growth form and its presence of an arachiform vacuolar body in the ascospores, was synonymised with Xanthoparmelia when it was shown that its species cluster in different clades nested within Xanthoparmelia. The genus Omphalodiella, proposed by Aino Henssen in 1991 to contain the Patagonian species Omphalodiella patagonica, has since been shown to lie within Xanthoparmelia.

== Description ==
Xanthoparmelia consists of lichens that has a thallus ranging from leaf-like (foliose) to almost crust-like (subcrustose) and occasionally almost shrub-like (subfruticose), typically forming large, flat patches that are either loosely or tightly attached to the substrate. The thallus is composed of lobes which may vary from irregular to linear shapes, are often flat or can be twisted or folded (strongly convoluted), and lack hair-like projections (cilia) at the edges, which may be notched or lobed.

The upper surface of the thallus is commonly pale yellow to yellow-green or grey-green, indicative of the presence of usnic acid, a substance common in lichens, or it may be a shade of brown if the lichen lacks usnic acid. This surface often develops irregular cracks and may or may not display patches of soredia (asexual reproductive structures that break away to form new lichens) or isidia (outgrowths that can also lead to new lichens). Lichens in this genus do not have pseudocyphellae, which are small pores on the surface. The upper cortex—the outer layer of the lichen—is composed of vertically aligned hyphae (the filamentous cells of fungi) or tightly packed cells with a pored outer layer (epicortex). These cells contain a specific type of lichen-specific polysaccharide known as Xanthoparmelia-type lichenan. The medulla, or internal layer beneath the cortex, is loosely structured and typically white, although it can be pigmented. The lower surface of the thallus can range from pale ivory to various shades of yellow, tan, brown, or black, and is covered to varying extents with rhizines (root-like structures) that typically do not branch.

The reproductive structures of Xanthoparmelia include ascomata, known as apothecia, which are typically found on the surface of the thallus and may be slightly raised or stalked. The discs of these structures are initially concave but become flatter and distorted with age and are coloured from red-brown to brown or black. The ascospores produced in these structures are small, ellipsoidal, and each contains an arachiform vacuolar body, with eight spores per ascus. Another reproductive feature, conidiomata (pycnidia), are usually found immersed in the thallus and produce spores that are typically two-ended (bifusiform) or cylindrical.

Chemically, the cortex of Xanthoparmelia lichens contains either usnic acid or an unknown brown pigment, while the medulla may contain a variety of chemical compounds including orcinol depsides, orcinol depsidones, β-orcinol depsides, β-orcinol depsidones, anthraquinones, aliphatic acids, and amino acid derivatives.

== Species ==
Xanthoparmelia is the largest genus of lichen-forming fungi, with more than 800 accepted species. Species include:

- Xanthoparmelia chlorochroa
- Xanthoparmelia conspersa (Parmelia conspersa)
- Xanthoparmelia cumberlandia
- Xanthoparmelia lavicola - a foliose (leaf-like) lichen found on basalt
- Xanthoparmelia lineola
- Xanthoparmelia maricopensis
- Xanthoparmelia mexicana
- Xanthoparmelia metastrigosa
- Xanthoparmelia mougeotii (Parmelia mougeotii)
- Xanthoparmelia nana
- Xanthoparmelia pokornyi
- Xanthoparmelia subramigera
- Xanthoparmelia scabrosa
- Xanthoparmelia tinctina

== Gallery ==
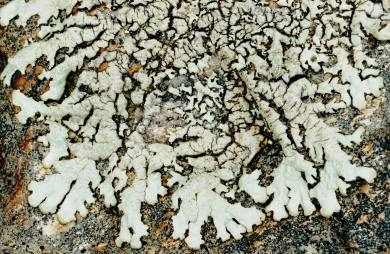
Xanthoparmelia plittii

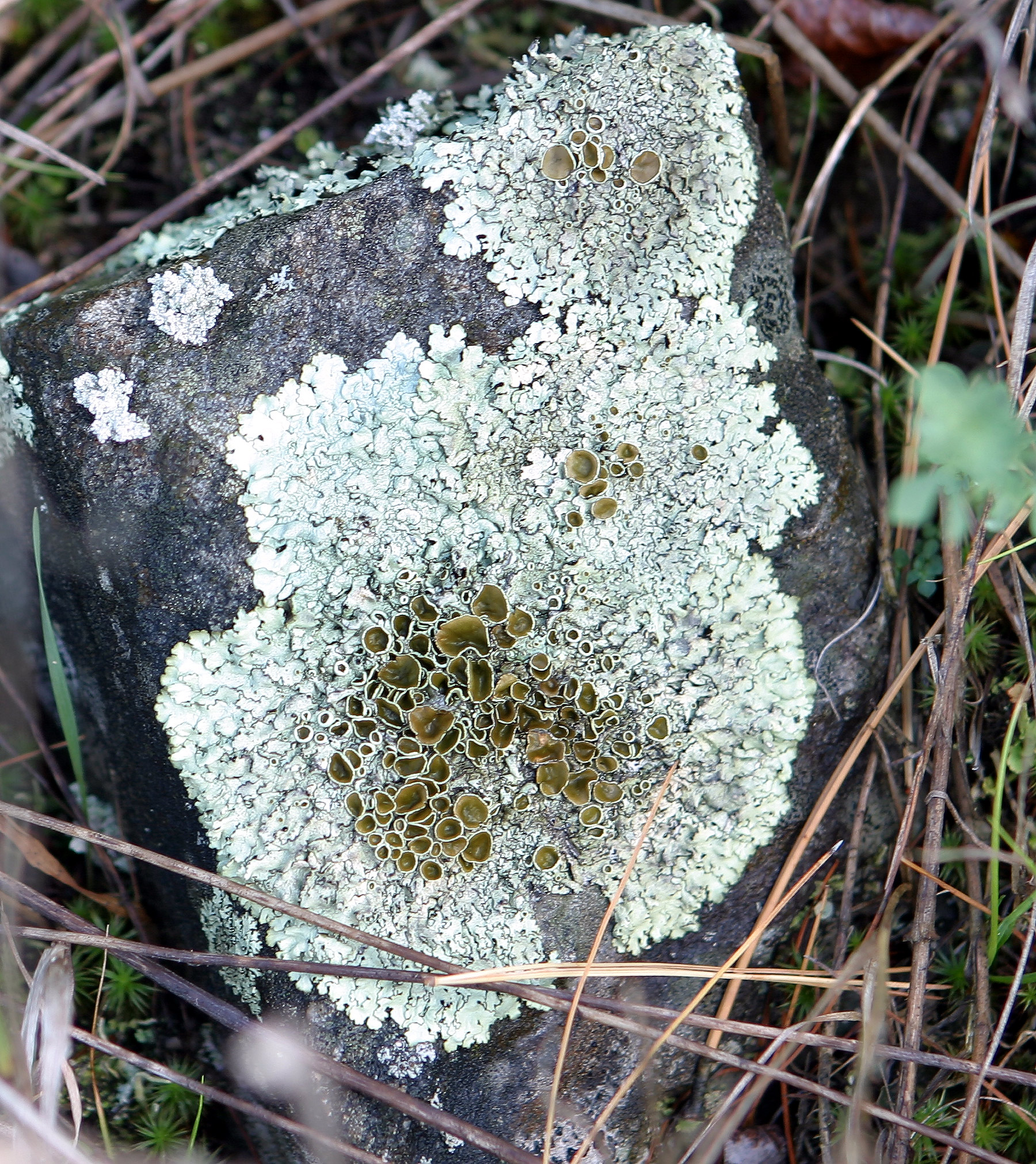
Unidentified Xanthoparmelia sp.

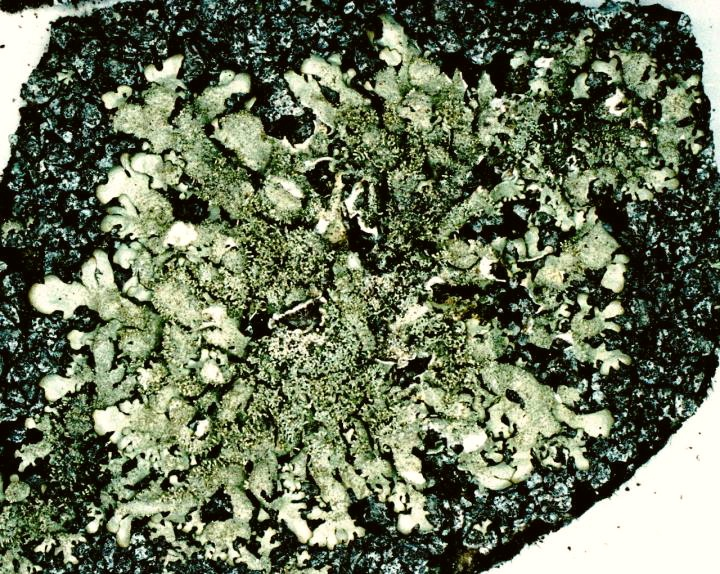
Xanthoparmelia subramigera growing on an asphalt shingle roof in Maryland, United States
