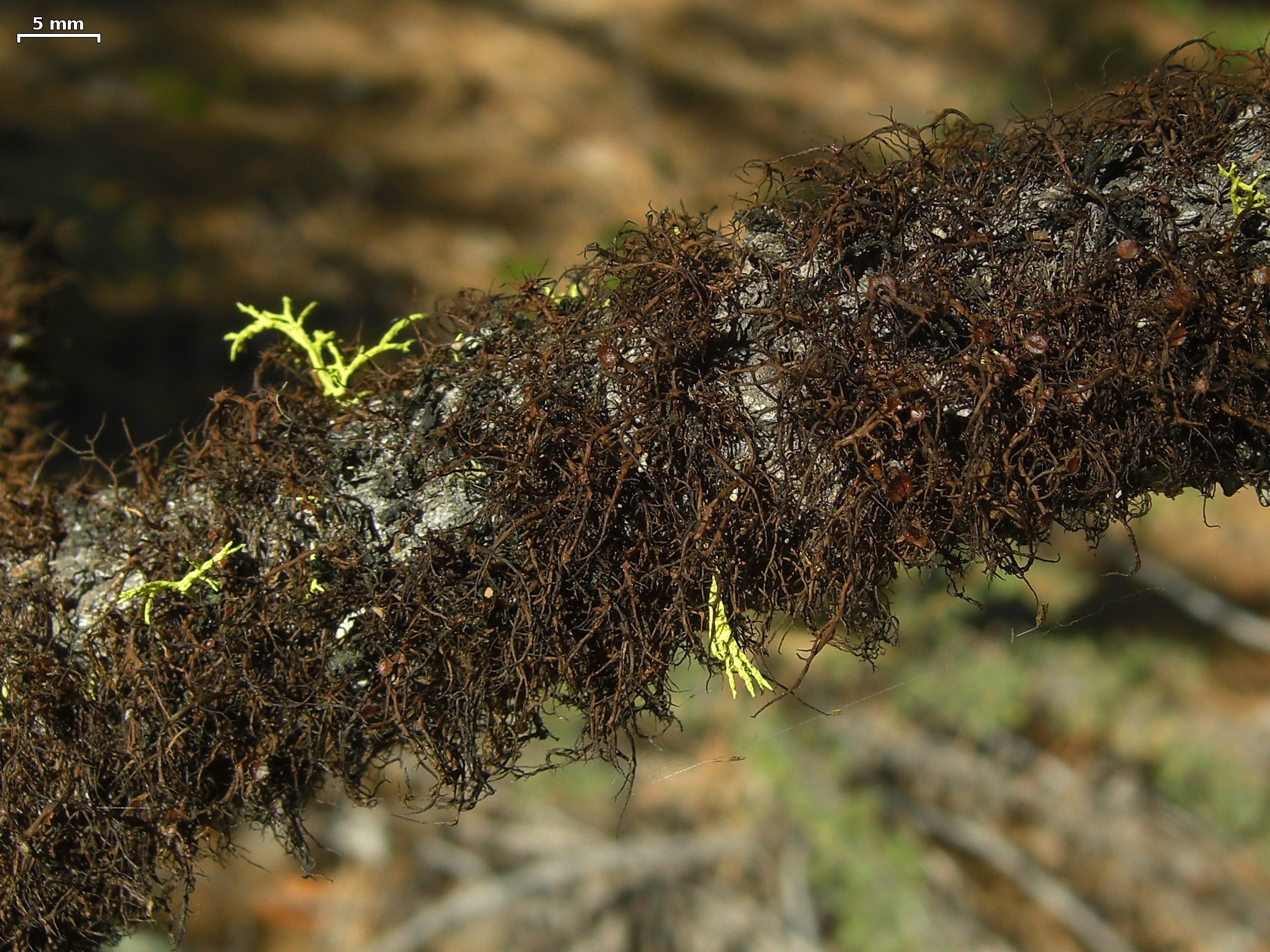
- In Satus Pass, Washington

Scientific classification
- Kingdom: Fungi
- Division: Ascomycota
- Class: Lecanoromycetes
- Order: Lecanorales
- Family: Parmeliaceae
- Genus: Nodobryoria
- Species: N. abbreviata

Binomial name
- Nodobryoria abbreviata (Müll.Arg.) Common & Brodo (1995)

Synonyms
- Alectoria divergens f. abbreviata Müll.Arg. (1889); Alectoria abbreviata (Müll.Arg.) R.Howe (1912); Bryopogon abbreviatus (Müll.Arg.) Gyeln. (1935); Bryoria abbreviata (Müll.Arg.) Brodo & D.Hawksw. (1977)

= Nodobryoria abbreviata =

Species of lichen

Nodobryoria abbreviata, the tufted foxtail lichen, is a species of fruticose lichen in the family Parmeliaceae. It was originally classified as a form of Alectoria in 1889, then moved to the genus Bryoria, before being transferred to the newly created genus Nodobryoria in 1995 based on distinctive anatomical and chemical differences. The lichen grows throughout western North America, from British Columbia south to Baja California, typically found on conifer bark and dead wood in forests from valley bottoms to near the tree line. It is most common in the interior Pacific Northwest, especially in open pine and larch forests east of the Cascade Range. The species can be distinguished from similar lichens by its distinct surface texture, which has a matte appearance created by interlocking cells arranged like jigsaw puzzle pieces, and by its complete lack of secondary metabolites that are commonly found in related species. In forest ecosystems, it ranks among the more abundant epiphytic lichens and often grows alongside other lichens such as Bryoria and Letharia species.

== Taxonomy ==
The species Nodobryoria abbreviata was originally described as Alectoria divergens f. abbreviata by Johannes Müller Argoviensis in 1889, based on material collected from Mount Hood, Oregon, where it grew on the ground and fallen twigs. Müller described the form as compact and fertile, about an inch long, with eight spores per ascus measuring 9–9.5 μm × 4.5–5.5 μm. It was later transferred to Bryoria by Irwin M. Brodo and David Hawksworth (1977) as part of Bryoria sect. Subdivergentes. Subsequent anatomical and chemical studies by Ralph Common and Brodo demonstrated that this group differed markedly from other Bryoria species. Key differences included its distinctive nodular cortex, lack of the polysaccharide lichenin, and unique ascus features. As a result, Common and Brodo elevated the section to independent genus rank in 1995, establishing Nodobryoria to accommodate N. abbreviata, N. oregana, and N. subdivergens.

The genus name combines the Latin nodus ('knot' or 'node'), referring to the jigsaw-like pattern of the outer cortical cells, with Bryoria, the genus from which it was segregated. In the same work, Nodobryoria abbreviata was designated as the type species of the new genus. It is commonly known as the "tufted foxtail lichen".

Common and Brodo classified Nodobryoria within the family Parmeliaceae, citing its parmelioid asci, small ellipsoid to more or less spherical spores, and the presence of rod-shaped conidia produced in immersed or slightly emergent black pycnidia. They noted that its morphology and chemistry distinguish it from Bryoria in the strict sense, while its cortex structure and lack of secondary metabolites suggest a closer affinity to Pseudephebe and other parmelioid genera.

== Description ==
The thallus is reddish brown and tufted, forming erect to somewhat erect strands to about 3 cm long. Branches are round to somewhat angular in cross-section and often appear finely spiny due to short, pointed lateral branchlets. Pseudocyphellae, soralia, and isidia are absent. Apothecia are usually lacking, but when present the margins may bear cilia. Standard spot tests are negative throughout the thallus. The branches are reddish-brown to dull chestnut in color and often brittle when dry. They are usually thin, repeatedly branched, and may become somewhat flattened or twisted near the base or at branch junctions.

The cortex structure is distinctive, consisting of a two-layered arrangement with an outer paraplectenchymatous layer of small, leptodermatous cells forming the characteristic jigsaw-puzzle pattern, and an inner prosoplectenchymatous layer that is more homogeneous than in related genera. This structure gives the surface a matte appearance, unlike the glossy sheen seen in many related Bryoria species. Just beneath this outer layer lies a thinner inner zone of elongated, parallel hyphae (fungal filaments). The species lacks lichenin, a type of structural polysaccharide commonly found in the cell walls of most related lichens; this absence helps distinguish Nodobryoria from Bryoria and other alectorioid genera.

The lichen's reproductive bodies (apothecia) are of the lecanorine type, with soft margins derived from the thallus itself. They are often dark brown to black and may occur along the branches. Inside, the sac-like asci each contain eight transparent (hyaline) spores that are ellipsoid to nearly spherical and measure about 6 × 4 μm. The outer covering of the apothecium (the excipulum) is gelatinized and well-defined, helping to distinguish the genus. The hymenium (the spore-producing layer) is narrow and lightly colored, and its pigments do not change when treated with alkali.

Tiny black pycnidia (asexual reproductive structures) occur frequently, partly embedded in the thallus surface. They produce straight, spindle-shaped (bifusiform) conidia about 5–8 μm long. The species contains no secondary metabolites detectable by thin-layer chromatography, further setting it apart from many members of the Parmelia group that produce characteristic lichen products.

=== Similar species ===
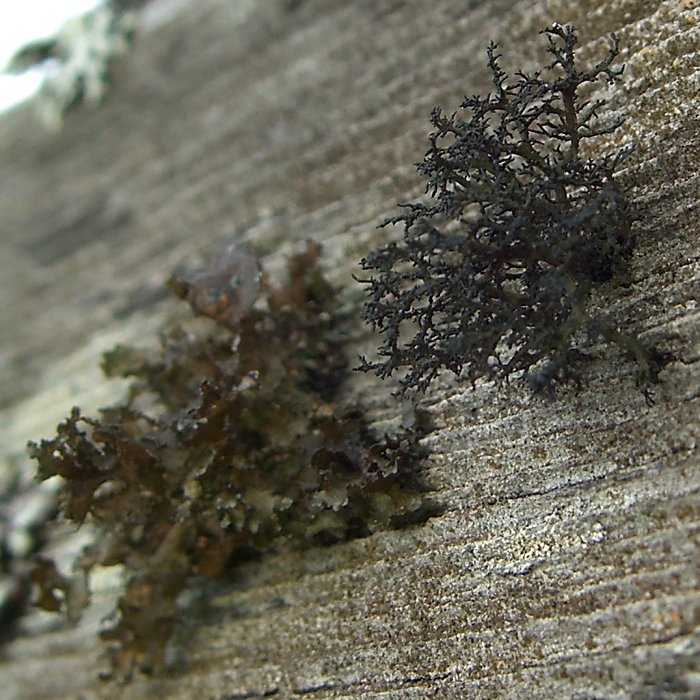
Kaernefeltia californica (right) growing alongside Tuckermannopsis orbata; C. californica can be confused with Nodobryoria abbreviata due to similar fruticose habit and branching patterns.

In the field Nodobryoria abbreviata can be mistaken for Kaernefeltia californica and Nodobryoria oregana. K. californica is restricted to coastal areas and tends to be more olive-brown to greenish-black. N. oregana shares the reddish-brown color but typically forms much longer, hanging strands with slender branches and is less likely to show apothecia.

== Habitat and distribution ==
Nodobryoria abbreviata is native to western North America and is common in the interior Pacific Northwest, from western Montana and Idaho north into British Columbia and south to Baja California, with peak occurrence east of the Cascade Range. It has been recorded from the interior ranges of British Columbia and Alberta, and the Pacific Northwest states including Idaho and Washington.

It grows on conifer bark and dead wood from valley bottoms up to near the tree line, especially in open pine and larch forests east of the Cascades. It also occurs high in the crowns of moist, closed forests in the same region. It has also been reported occasionally on exposed rock. The closely related N. oregana and N. subdivergens show overlapping ranges, but N. abbreviata is typically found at lower altitudes and in more continental climates than the other two.

In serpentine habitats of the California Coast Ranges, it was most often recorded on exposed ridge-top plots with rocky outcrops, low stand basal area, and scattered serpentine-stunted conifers, while elevation and slope had no detectable effect on macrolichen community composition. In northern and central California plot surveys, N. abbreviata was identified (via indicator species analysis) as characteristic of the dry, cool Sierra–southern Cascades–Modoc subregion; it was much less frequent in the Greater Central Valley, with additional records along the northwest coast, consistent with occurrence on the drier, more continental side of the state's macroclimatic gradients.

== Ecology ==
In south-central British Columbia, a lower-canopy survey across all aspects of a small volcanic cone found that melanic hair lichens (the group that includes Nodobryoria) were concentrated on open, sun-exposed south-facing slopes and near the summit, whereas usnic, pale-green hair lichens (e.g. Alectoria, Ramalina) were more abundant on north-facing and basal, shaded slopes. Canopy openness alone explained about 69% of the variation in melanic hair-lichen cover across trees. The authors interpreted this as pigment-driven: dark cortical melanin in Nodobryoria/Bryoria screens excess light and heat, favouring bright, drier canopy microsites; usnic-acid cortices suit shadier positions. Within that dataset, Nodobryoria was consistently less abundant than co-occurring Bryoria in the lower canopy, with N. abbreviata present on about 20% of trees and typically covering less than 2% of the sampled branch surface when present, reaching only moderate cover on sun-exposed summit slopes.

In low-elevation east-slope forests of the eastern Washington Cascades, litterfall sampling recorded N. abbreviata in open pine, young mixed Douglas-fir/grand fir, and mature mixed stands. Its litterfall biomass was highest in young mixed stands (≈360 g/ha), and lower in mature mixed (≈109 g/ha) and open pine forests (≈62 g/ha). It contributed about 3% of total epiphytic lichen litterfall, placing it among the six most abundant species in that dataset. Across the same landscape, overall epiphyte biomass, especially hair lichens, rose with stand structural complexity and moisture, with mature mixed stands carrying the largest loads; N. abbreviata occurred across all three cover types.

A lichenicolous fungus, Lichenoconium christiansenii, has been described from the apothecia of N. abbreviata specimens collected in Washington State that were found on fallen conifer branches in subalpine fir–Engelmann spruce forest on Mount Adams. Its tiny black pycnidia form in the upper hymenium without discoloring the discs and with hyphae confined to the immediate vicinity. The association is therefore interpreted as commensal rather than parasitic.

Reported associates across western North America include Bryoria fremontii, B. fuscescens, Letharia columbiana, L. vulpina, Tuckermannopsis orbata, T. platyphylla, and, at lower elevations, Vulpicida canadensis.
