= Bryoria irwinii =

Scientific classification
- Kingdom: Fungi
- Division: Ascomycota
- Class: Lecanoromycetes
- Order: Lecanorales
- Family: Parmeliaceae
- Genus: Bryoria
- Species: B. irwinii

Binomial name
- Bryoria irwinii Goward & Myllys (2016)
- Holotype: Mt. Hayes, near Prince Rupert, British Columbia

Species of lichen

Bryoria irwinii is a species of horsehair lichen in the family Parmeliaceae. The species is endemic to coastal northwestern North America, with a range extending from central British Columbia to southeastern Alaska. Unlike some widespread members of the genus, B. irwinii has a relatively restricted geographic distribution, being found only in cool, hypermaritime regions where it grows primarily on conifer trunks and branches, especially those of Pinus species in well-ventilated locations.

== Taxonomy ==
Bryoria irwinii was described in 2016 by the lichenologists Trevor Goward and Leena Myllys. The type specimen was collected in Canada, specifically in British Columbia near Prince Rupert on Mt. Hayes. It was found at an elevation of 400 m (1,300 ft) in a sloped bog, growing on the twigs of a dwarfed Pinus contorta (lodgepole pine). The specimen was gathered on 6 September 2012 by Curtis Björk (collection number 29741). The holotype is housed at the University of British Columbia (UBC) herbarium, with an isotype preserved at the University of Helsinki (H) herbarium. The species was named in honour of Irwin M. Brodo of the Canadian Museum of Nature, recognizing his contributions to the understanding of Bryoria and other Alectorioid lichens.

Molecular phylogenetics analysis based on ITS and MCM7 (genetic markers) places B. irwinii within section Bryoria clade 2, where it forms a strongly supported group with several related species including B. furcellata, B. nitidula, B. trichodes, B. araucana, B. nadvornikiana, B. simplicior and B. poeltii. Within this clade, it appears to be most closely related to B. araucana from South America, though B. irwinii can be distinguished by its numerous perpendicular side branches.

== Description ==
Bryoria irwinii grows in a somewhat drooping fashion, typically reaching lengths of 5–12 cm (2.0–4.7 in). Its branches are olive-coloured throughout, marked by distinctive black patches that can extend up to 15 mm (5/8 in) in length. The surface of the lichen has a slight shine and is decorated with numerous small, pale brownish spots (called pseudocyphellae) that are fusiform or spindle-shaped. These spots are quite noticeable against the olive background of the branches.

A key distinguishing feature of this species is its branching pattern, where smaller branches divide unevenly from larger ones, creating a distinctive asymmetrical appearance. The lichen produces numerous short side branches that grow at right angles to the main branches, and these side branches are often slightly narrowed at their base. B. irwinii does not produce soredia (powdery reproductive propagules) or isidia (small outgrowths), and fruiting bodies (apothecia) have not been observed in this species. The lichen can either contain fumarprotocetraric acid, which causes it to turn red when tested with the spot test reagent Pd, or it may lack any secondary compounds entirely.

== Habitat and distribution ==
Bryoria irwinii is endemic to the Pacific Northwest region of North America, with a restricted geographic range extending from central British Columbia northward to southeastern Alaska. Despite its limited distribution, the species is reported to be relatively common within suitable habitats throughout its range. The species shows a strong preference for cool, humid coastal environments, where it grows primarily on tree bark. It colonises the trunks and branches of coniferous trees, with a particular affinity for pine species. The lichen favours well-ventilated, open locations that provide adequate exposure while maintaining the humid conditions typical of coastal environments. The species' restricted distribution and specific habitat preferences suggest it has evolved to grow in the distinctive climate of the Pacific Northwest coast, where cool temperatures and high humidity are common year-round. A 2018 fungal survey recorded it on Calvert Island, on the central coast of British Columbia.
