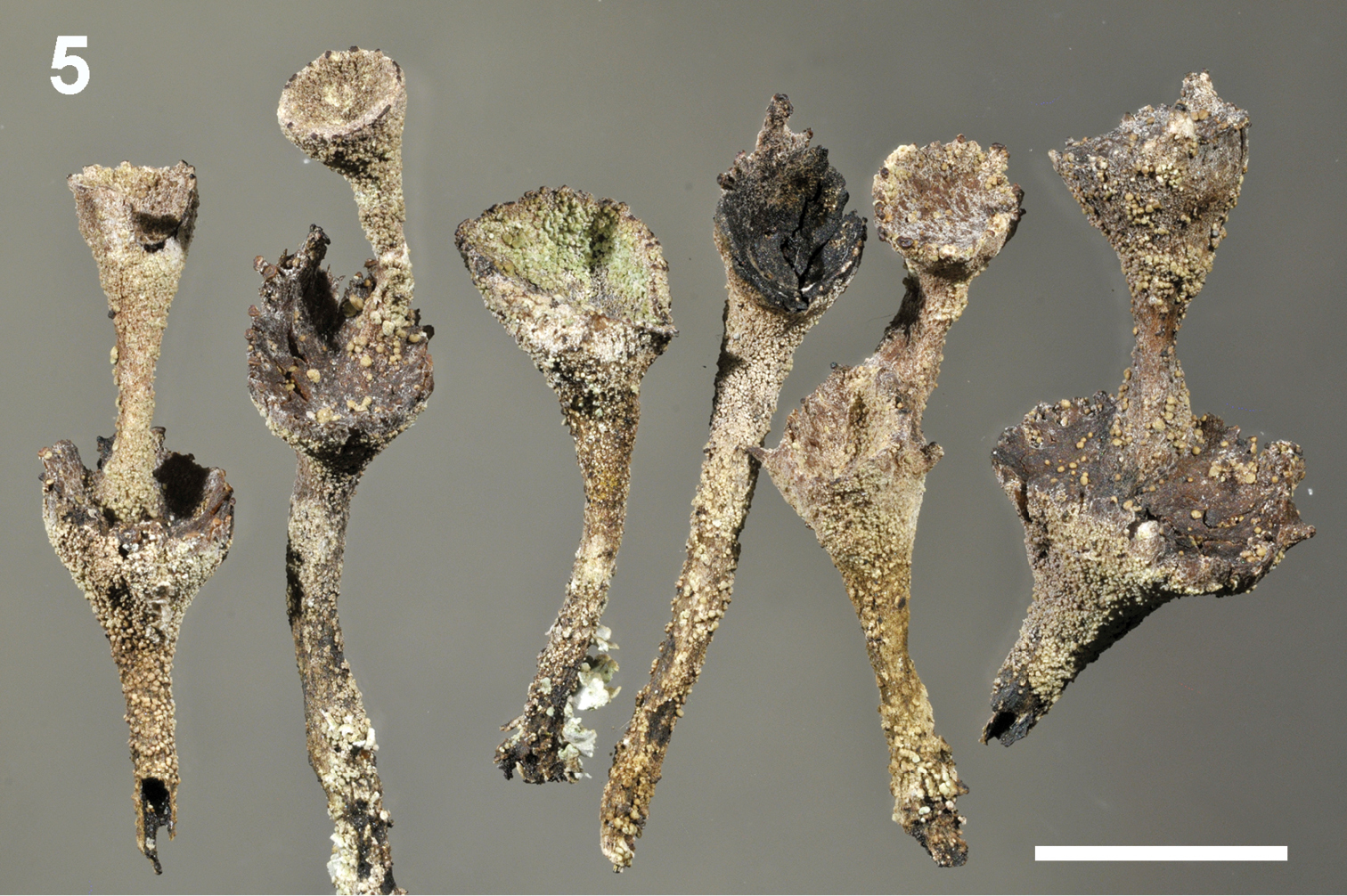

Scientific classification
- Kingdom: Fungi
- Division: Ascomycota
- Class: Lecanoromycetes
- Order: Lecanorales
- Family: Cladoniaceae
- Genus: Cladonia
- Species: C. albonigra

Binomial name
- Cladonia albonigra Brodo & Ahti (1996)

= Cladonia albonigra =

Species of lichen

Cladonia albonigra (Bokmål: Svartfotbeger, Swedish: Svartvit bägarlav) is a species of fruticose lichen in the family Cladoniaceae. Found from Alaska to California, this lichen grows in both wet bogs and dry forest floors as long as there is abundant sunlight. The species develops characteristic tiered cup structures that start light-coloured but gradually blacken from the bottom up as the outer layer flakes away. It was first scientifically described in 1996 and has since been found in limited locations in Europe and Russia as well.

== Taxonomy ==
The species was formally described by the lichenologists Irwin M. Brodo and Teuvo Ahti as part of their 1996 revision of the Cladonia chlorophaea species complex. The holotype, collected by Brodo in 1971 from an open lodgepole-pine bog on Graham Island in Haida Gwaii (then the Queen Charlotte Islands), anchored the name. Morphologically, C. albonigra is grouped with members of the C. chlorophaea aggregate but is set apart by two consistent traits: a conspicuously blackened medulla that advances from the base upward, and the frequent production of central proliferations in the scyphi. These characters are absent from other, otherwise similar species such as C. merochlorophaea. Despite sharing grayanic acid with the eastern North American C. grayi, the latter seldom melanises and rarely proliferates centrally, so confusion is unlikely. Chemotype variation within C. albonigra appears to correlate only loosely with subtle differences in stature, amount of squamulation and degree of melanisation, and all three chemotypes are currently treated as a single species.

In a molecular phylogenetics analysis published in 2024, Cladonia albonigra was phylogenetically positioned within a clade that includes several closely related Cladonia species such as C. graeca, C. krempelhuberi, and members of the C. rappii complex, forming part of a larger grouping that is sister to the C. pulvinata clade.

== Description ==
Cladonia albonigra begins as a squamulose (scale-like) primary thallus—small, scale-like lobes that lie close to or rise slightly from the substrate. These squamules, 0.5–2 mm long, are grey-green to pale yellow-green above and white beneath, and they lack the powdery reproductive granules (soredia) often seen in other lichens. From this crust grow slender, upright podetia (the stalk-like secondary branches typical of Cladonia), 1–4 cm tall and 1–2.5 mm wide. Each podetium terminates in a broad, cup-shaped scyphus; the rim of the cup may be smooth or toothed, and the cups commonly "bud" new tiers either from the centre or the margin, sometimes forming four or five storeys. A striking feature is the podetium's strongly melanotic base: as the cortex flakes away, the underlying tissue gradually turns black, so older parts look dark while the newest proliferations remain pale. The exposed surface is patchily covered with thick, convex areoles and occasional tiny, round squamules that lie flat or curve outward like minute shields.

The podetia often acquire a coarse granular or sorediate coating, especially on their upper half and within the cups, giving a dusty look. Brown, hemispherical apothecia (the spore-bearing discs) appear only sparingly on the cup rims, and small reddish-brown pycnidia—flask-shaped bodies that release asexual spores—may also develop there. Chemical spot tests are distinctive: the thallus turns red with para-phenylenediamine (PD+), remains unchanged with potassium hydroxide (K–), and fluoresces bright blue-white or not at all under ultraviolet light. Three chemotypes occur. The commonest, widespread from Haida Gwaii north to Alaska, contains grayanic acid (often with 4-O-methylgrayanic acid) together with fumarprotocetraric acid. A southern chemotype, frequent in coastal Washington, Oregon and California, replaces grayanic acid with 4-O-methylcryptochlorophaeic acid and shows heavier squamule development. A third, largely Alaskan strain lacks orcinol meta-depsides other than fumarprotocetraric acid and tends to be less intensely blackened and of medium height.

== Habitat and distribution ==
Cladonia albonigra colonises mineral soil, decaying wood and moss in open, sunny situations. It tolerates both wet bogs and relatively dry forest floors, provided light is abundant. In Haida Gwaii it occurs from sea level to alpine ridges and is one of the common Cladonia species across the archipelago. Beyond the islands it traces the Pacific coast of North America, reaching northwestern Alaska and extending south through British Columbia, Washington and Oregon to coastal California. Chemotype 1 is dominant from Haida Gwaii northward; chemotype 2 becomes more frequent toward the southern end of the range, while chemotype 3 is most often encountered in Alaska. It has been recorded from the Arkhangelsk Oblast, of Northwest Russia; specimens collected from here contain the fumarprotocetraric acid complex. European records of C. albonigra are limited to specimens from Norway containing fumarprotocetraric acid (corresponding to chemotype III of Brodo & Ahti 1996), though the taxonomic identity of this Norwegian material remains questionable.

== Species interactions ==
Phaeopyxis punctum is a lichenicolous (lichen-dwelling) fungus that has been recorded parasitizing Cladonia albonigra. It infects the podetia and basal squamules of the lichen, forming small black apothecia that are initially immersed in the host thallus and, when destroyed, leave deep holes in the lichen surface.
