= Xanthoparmelia nodulosa =

Scientific classification
- Kingdom: Fungi
- Division: Ascomycota
- Class: Lecanoromycetes
- Order: Lecanorales
- Family: Parmeliaceae
- Genus: Xanthoparmelia
- Species: X. nodulosa

Binomial name
- Xanthoparmelia nodulosa Elix (2006)
- Holotype: Boorabbin National Park, Western Australia

Species of lichen

Xanthoparmelia nodulosa is a little-known species of saxicolous (rock-dwelling) foliose lichen in the family Parmeliaceae. It is only known to occur in Western Australia.

== Taxonomy ==
Xanthoparmelia nodulosa was first described by the lichenologist John Elix in 2006. The specific epithet, nodulosa, comes from the Latin nodulus, meaning "nodule", referring to the globose (spherical), nodule-like isidia characteristic of this species.

== Description ==
Xanthoparmelia nodulosa features a foliose (leafy), loosely attached thallus that forms rosettes ranging from 1 to 4 cm wide. The lobes are separate to loosely imbricate (overlapping), linear-elongate, and dichotomously branched, measuring 0.3 to 1.0 mm wide. The upper thallus surface is yellow to pale yellow-green, transitioning from flat to weakly convex, and becomes rugulose (wrinkled) and areolate with age, featuring distinctive white maculae (spots) towards the lobe tips. This species lacks soredia but produces isidia in small, scattered groups that are spherical at first and then cylindrical or lobulate. The medulla is white, while the lower surface is smooth and yellow, turning canaliculate (channeled) in parts. Rhizines are sparse, simple, or often furcate, and black, extending beyond the lobe margin. Chemical tests reveal the presence of usnic acid, fumarprotocetraric acid, and several other trace compounds.

== Habitat and distribution ==
As of its original publication date, Xanthoparmelia nodulosa was known only from its type locality in Western Australia, specifically Boorabbin Rock in the Boorabbin National Park. It grows on soil over granite boulders within Allocasuarina–Acacia woodland.

The cortex reacts K−, while the medulla reacts K+ (pale yellow turning dirty brown), C−, and P+ (orange-red). Chemical constituents include usnic acid (major), fumarprotocetraric acid (major), succinprotocetraric acid (minor), and traces of other acids.

== See also ==
- List of Xanthoparmelia species
