= Xanthoparmelia viridis =

Scientific classification
- Kingdom: Fungi
- Division: Ascomycota
- Class: Lecanoromycetes
- Order: Lecanorales
- Family: Parmeliaceae
- Genus: Xanthoparmelia
- Species: X. viridis

Binomial name
- Xanthoparmelia viridis Hale (1986)

Species of lichen

Xanthoparmelia viridis is a species of saxicolous (rock-dwelling), foliose lichen in the family Parmeliaceae. Found in Southern Africa, it was formally described as a new species in 1986 by the American lichenologist Mason Hale. The type specimen was collected by Hale from the Karoo Desert National Botanical Garden (Worcester) at an elevation of 300 m (980 ft), where it was found on a hillside growing on schist ledges. The lichen thallus is greenish yellow in color and measures 6–10 cm (2.4–3.9 in) broad, comprising somewhat irregular to more or less linear lobes that are 1.2–2.5 mm wide. It contains fumarprotocetraric acid, succinprotocetraric acid, and usnic acid.

== See also ==
- List of Xanthoparmelia species
