= Xanthoparmelia nuwarensis =

Scientific classification
- Kingdom: Fungi
- Division: Ascomycota
- Class: Lecanoromycetes
- Order: Lecanorales
- Family: Parmeliaceae
- Genus: Xanthoparmelia
- Species: X. nuwarensis

Binomial name
- Xanthoparmelia nuwarensis Hale (1986)

Species of lichen

Xanthoparmelia nuwarensis is a species of saxicolous (rock-dwelling), foliose lichen in the family Parmeliaceae. Found in Southern Africa, it was formally described as a new species in 1986 by the American lichenologist Mason Hale. The type specimen was collected from Cape Province at an elevation of 500 m (1,600 ft), where it was found growing in a pasture on sun-exposed sandstone ledges. The lichen has a loosely attached thallus that is dark greenish-yellow in color and measures 6–9 cm (2.4–3.5 in) in diameter. It contains fumarprotocetraric acid, succinprotocetraric acid, and usnic acid. It is a member of the species complex centered around Xanthoparmelia phaeophana.

== See also ==
- List of Xanthoparmelia species
