= C22H18O12 =

The molecular formula C_{22}H_{18}O_{12} (molar mass: 474.371 g/mol) may refer to:

- Chicoric acid
- Succinprotocetraric acid
