= Buellia capensis =

Scientific classification
- Domain: Eukaryota
- Kingdom: Fungi
- Division: Ascomycota
- Class: Lecanoromycetes
- Order: Caliciales
- Family: Caliciaceae
- Genus: Buellia
- Species: B. capensis

Binomial name
- Buellia capensis Elix & H.Mayrhofer (2021)

Species of lichen

Buellia capensis is a species of crustose lichen in the family Caliciaceae. Found in South Africa, it was formally described as new species in 2021 by John Elix and Helmut Mayrhofer. The type specimen was collected south of Langebaan (Seeberg, Cape Province) at an altitude ranging from 80 to 130 m (260 to 430 ft); here it was found growing on granite from a south-exposed slope. It is only known from the type collection. The contains several secondary compounds, including lichexanthone and secalonic acid A as major metabolites, and trace amounts of fumarprotocetraric acid and succinprotocetraric acid. The specific epithet capensis refers to the region of the type locality.

== See also ==
- List of Buellia species
