= Bryoria rigida =

Scientific classification
- Kingdom: Fungi
- Division: Ascomycota
- Class: Lecanoromycetes
- Order: Lecanorales
- Family: Parmeliaceae
- Genus: Bryoria
- Species: B. rigida

Binomial name
- Bryoria rigida P.M.Jørg. & Myllys (2012)
- Holotype: Cang Mountain, Yunnan, China

Species of lichen

Bryoria rigida is a species of horsehair lichen in the family Parmeliaceae. It is known from high-elevation forests in Yunnan, China, and both Darjeeling and Sikkimin India. It was formally described in 2012 and is characterized by its upright, cushion-like growth, rigid branching pattern, and black, spine-covered stems. Unlike some related species, it lacks specialized reproductive structures such as soralia or isidia. Bryoria rigida grows in humid, foggy environments at elevations between 3,500 and 4,300 m (11,500 and 14,100 ft), growing on mossy rocks and tree branches. Chemical analyses have identified fumarprotocetraric acid as its main secondary metabolite.

== Taxonomy ==
The lichen was described as a new species in 2012 by the lichenologists Per Magnus Jørgensen and Leena Myllys. The species epithet rigida alludes to its "markedly stiff" thallus. The type specimen was collected in China's Yunnan Province, within the Dali Bai Autonomous Prefecture, on Cang Mountain. It was found growing on rock at an elevation of 3,570 m (11,710 ft) on 28 July 2005 by Li-Song Wang (collection number 06-26208). The holotype is deposited at the Kunming Institute of Botany (KUN).

Molecular phylogenetics studies have shown that Bryoria rigida belongs to section Divaricatae subclade II within the genus Bryoria. This placement has been confirmed through multi-locus analyses using various genetic markers. The species consistently forms a well-supported monophyletic group in phylogenetic analyses, particularly in studies using ITS (internal transcribed spacer) and IGS (intergenic spacer) genetic regions. It shares this subclade with several related species including B. asiatica, B. barbata, B. bicolor, B. fruticulosa, B. tenuis, and B. yunnanensis, though it maintains its distinctness as a species.

== Description ==
Bryoria rigida forms upright, cushion-like tufts that can grow up to 5 cm tall. The species is distinctly bicolorous, with black basal parts and olivaceous-brown apical portions. The main stems are black, reaching up to 0.8 mm in width, and give rise to rigid, evenly branched offshoots. The smaller branchlets, often with an olive-brown tint near their tips, project upwards at sharp angles of about 45° to 65°. Many of these branches have small, spine-like projections with constricted bases.

The surface of the lichen features black, elongated pores known as pseudocyphellae, which are typically 0.1 mm wide and 0.2–0.7 mm long. These structures are most commonly found on the finer branches. Unlike some related species, B. rigida does not produce soralia or isidia, meaning it lacks specialized structures for asexual reproduction. Other reproductive structures, including apothecia and conidiomata, have not been observed.

Chemical spot tests tests reveal that the cortex and medulla react positively with para-phenylenediamine (PD+ red-orange), while other standard spot tests yield negative results. The main secondary metabolites identified are fumarprotocetraric acid, with protocetraric acid sometimes present, along with trace amounts of quaesitic and confumarprotocetraric acids, as determined by thin-layer chromatography.

== Habitat and distribution ==
Bryoria rigida has been recorded from Yunnan, China, and both Darjeeling and Sikkim in India, though it is likely more widespread across the Himalayan region. It occurs at elevations between 3,500 and 4,300 m (11,500 and 14,100 ft) in humid, fog-dominated environments. The species grows on both moss-covered rocks and tree branches. The type locality is a mixed montane forest composed of Rhododendron species, Abies delavayi, and Fargesia nitida, where annual precipitation is about 1,874 mm (73.8 in) and the average temperature ranges from 7 to 8 °C (45 to 46 °F).
