= Bryoria hengduanensis =

Scientific classification
- Kingdom: Fungi
- Division: Ascomycota
- Class: Lecanoromycetes
- Order: Lecanorales
- Family: Parmeliaceae
- Genus: Bryoria
- Species: B. hengduanensis

Binomial name
- Bryoria hengduanensis Li S.Wang & H.Harada (2003)

Species of fungus

Bryoria hengduanensis is a species of lichen of the genus Bryoria. It was described as new to science in 2003 by lichenologists Li-Song Wang and Hiroshi Harada. It is found in the Hengduan Mountains of southern China, where it grows on twigs and branches in coniferous forests at elevations of 3,000–4,000 metres (9,800–13,100 ft). The Hengduan Mountains is a region of high Bryoria biodiversity, as 24 species are known from this area.

The lichen is fruticose, hair-like, hanging (pendent) from its substratum, and typically reaches lengths of 3–5 cm (1.2–2.0 in) long, although specimens up to 15 cm (6 in) have been recorded. It is black in parts near its base, and pale brown near the tips. The lichen has linear pseudocyphellae (with a depressed or fissured surface indentation) that twist into long spirals. Soralia, apothecia, and pycnidia are absent. Bryoria hengduanensis contains usnic and fumarprotocetraric acids.
