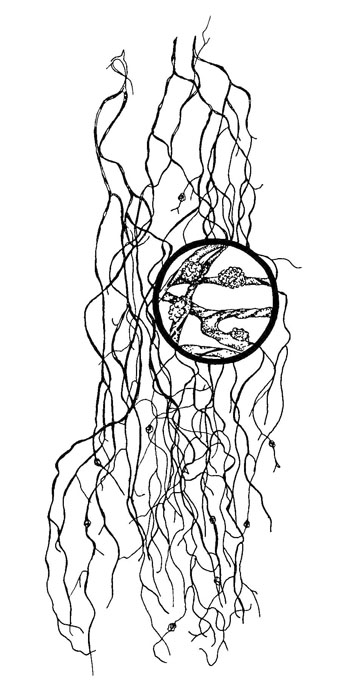
- btanical illustration of B. subcana

Scientific classification
- Domain: Eukaryota
- Kingdom: Fungi
- Division: Ascomycota
- Class: Lecanoromycetes
- Order: Lecanorales
- Family: Parmeliaceae
- Genus: Bryoria
- Species: B. subcana

Binomial name
- Bryoria subcana (Nyl. ex Stizenb.) Brodo & D.Hawksw. (1977)

Synonyms
- Alectoria prolixa var. subcana Nyl. ex Stizenb. (1892)

= Bryoria subcana =

Species of lichen in the family Parmeliaceae

Bryoria subcana is a species of horsehair lichen in the family Parmeliaceae. It is found in North America and Europe.
