= Catinaria radulae =

Scientific classification
- Kingdom: Fungi
- Division: Ascomycota
- Class: Lecanoromycetes
- Order: Lecanorales
- Family: Ramalinaceae
- Genus: Catinaria
- Species: C. radulae

Binomial name
- Catinaria radulae R.C.Harris & W.R.Buck (2016)

Species of lichen-forming fungus

Catinaria radulae is a species of lichen-forming fungus in the family Ramalinaceae. It is a liverwort-dwelling species that grows exclusively on the liverwort Radula flavifolia in southernmost Chile. No lichen body has been observed; the fungus is known only from its small black fruiting bodies on the host. It was described in 2016 from the Cape Horn Archipelago, where it was found in Magellanic tundra at low elevations.

== Taxonomy ==
Catinaria radulae was described as a new species in 2016 from southernmost Chile, where it occurs on the liverwort species Radula flavifolia (Radulaceae). The type specimen was collected in Alberto de Agostini National Park (Isla Grande de Tierra del Fuego), in Magellanic tundra at 15 m elevation, where it was found on the underside of branches and the trunk of Drimys winteri that were covered by the host liverwort. The authors placed the species in Catinaria because its reproductive structures match the genus in having small, dark biatorine apothecia and Catillaria-type asci with single-septum (1-septate), colourless ascospores, and because the anatomy of the proper exciple consists of radiating hyphae, as in the type species C. atropurpurea. The species epithet radulae refers to its seemingly obligate association with Radula.

== Description ==
No lichen body (thallus) was observed in the available material, and no algal partner (photobiont) was detected. The fruiting bodies (apothecia) are black, disc-shaped, and about 0.30–0.35 mm in diameter, with a slightly raised margin matching the colour of the disc. The outer rim (exciple) is brown and about 50 μm thick, built of weakly radiating hyphae with brown-pigmented tips; the spore-bearing layer (hymenium) is colourless (hyaline), not filled with oil droplets, and about 75 μm tall, while the tissue beneath it (hypothecium) is brownish and thin (about 25 μm tall). The paraphyses (sterile filaments between the asci) are unbranched (about 2 μm wide, occasionally to 3 μm) and may have brown pigment caps at the tips. The asci are narrowly club-shaped (clavate; about 35 × 12 μm) and each contains eight ascospores. The ascospores are colourless, 2-celled (1-septate), 12.5–17.5 × 6–7 μm, and have a conspicuously warted outer wall. Pycnidia were not observed, and standard spot tests were negative (K−, C−, KC−, P−, UV−). The material was too limited for a full thin-layer chromatography assessment.

== Habitat and distribution ==
Catinaria radulae is so far known only from the Cape Horn Archipelago in southernmost Chile, where it has been collected from three sites on three different islands, including Tierra del Fuego (Parque Nacional Alberto de Agostini), Londonderry Island, and Basket Island. It grows directly on the thallus of the liverwort Radula flavifolia, typically on sheltered surfaces such as the underside of branches and trunks of Drimys winteri in Magellanic tundra at low elevations. Although several Radula species were encountered with bryophilous fungi during the same inventory work, this species was only found on R. flavifolia. Additional Radula material examined from outside the archipelago (including the Brunswick Peninsula) did not yield further collections.
