= Bryoria kockiana =

Scientific classification
- Domain: Eukaryota
- Kingdom: Fungi
- Division: Ascomycota
- Class: Lecanoromycetes
- Order: Lecanorales
- Family: Parmeliaceae
- Genus: Bryoria
- Species: B. kockiana

Binomial name
- Bryoria kockiana Velmala, Myllys & Goward (2013)

Species of lichen

Bryoria kockiana (Kock's horsehair lichen) is a species of horsehair lichen in the family Parmeliaceae. It is found in North America, where it grows from the branches of conifer trees.

== Taxonomy ==
The lichen was described as a new species in 2013 by Saara Velmala, Leena Myllys, and Trevor Goward. The type specimen was collected in Fairbanks, Alaska in July 2011. The specific epithet kockiana honours Henry Kock, a horticulturalist from Ontario whose widow won an environmental fund-raising auction to purchase the right to name the species. It had previously been assigned to Bryoria implexa, but genetic analysis showed that this species is restricted in distribution to Europe and Asia, and its North America counterpart represented a different species. A later DNA study corroborated the validity of the species.

== Description ==
The thallus of Bryoria kockiana, which hangs from branches, can grow up to 27 cm (11 in). It is greyish brown or pale brown to brown in colour, which branches 0.1–0.2 mm in diameter. Propagules such as soralia, isidia and spinules are absent from the thallus. Pseudocyphellae (tiny pores that allow gas exchange) are brownish white to white, broad and elongated or filament-shaped and often raised somewhat, measuring 0.2–1.0 mm long by 0.1 mm wide. Lichen spot tests for the thallus are K− or K+ pale yellow, C−, KC−, PD+ yellow; these reactions indicate the presence of the secondary compounds psoromic acid, and sometimes also atranorin.

== Habitat and distribution ==
Bryoria kockiana is endemic to North America, where it grows on conifer branches. It has been recorded from Alaska and British Columbia.
