= Pseudephebe mariensis =

Scientific classification
- Kingdom: Fungi
- Division: Ascomycota
- Class: Lecanoromycetes
- Order: Lecanorales
- Family: Parmeliaceae
- Genus: Pseudephebe
- Species: P. mariensis

Binomial name
- Pseudephebe mariensis (Øvstedal, Common & Fryday) Øvstedal & Fryday (2019)

Synonyms
- Bryoria mariensis Øvstedal, Common & Fryday (2012)

Species of lichen

Pseudephebe mariensis is a species of fruticose lichen in the family Parmeliaceae. It is found on Mount Maria in the Falkland Islands, where it grows in grassland and Empetrum-heath. The lichen is found from elevations ranging from 500 to 650 m (1,640 to 2,130 ft).

== Taxonomy ==
It was first formally described as a new species by lichenologists Dag Øvstedal, Ralph Common, and Alan Fryday. The taxon was transferred to the genus Pseudephebe in 2019.

== Description ==
The thallus of Pseudephebe mariensis is fruticose, measuring up to 10 cm (3.9 in) in width. It has a prostrate growth form, lacking any distinct primary branches. The most robust branches have a diameter of up to 0.4 mm, but they typically measure less than 0.2 mm in diameter. Its branching pattern is isotomic dichotomous, meaning each branch divides into two roughly equal branches. While the younger branches have a brown hue, the older ones tend to be blackish in colour. The thallus has both pseudocyphellae and soralia. Pseudocyphellae are infrequent, linear in shape, and measure up to 0.3 mm in length and 0.05 mm in width. In the younger branches, the medulla might be occasionally visible; however, in most cases, they remain sealed and manifest a blackish colour. Soralia, on the other hand, are spherical, with diameters ranging between 0.3 and 0.5 mm, and share the same colour as the thallus. They are usually found at the end of branches or terminating the smaller side-branches close to the branch tips. The soredia measure between 14 and 20 mm in diameter. The cortex is reminiscent of the Nodobryoria type, featuring pseudoparenchymatous surface cells that present a knobbly appearance. Beneath this layer, prosoplechtenchymatous hyphae are embedded within a substantial gelatinous matrix.
