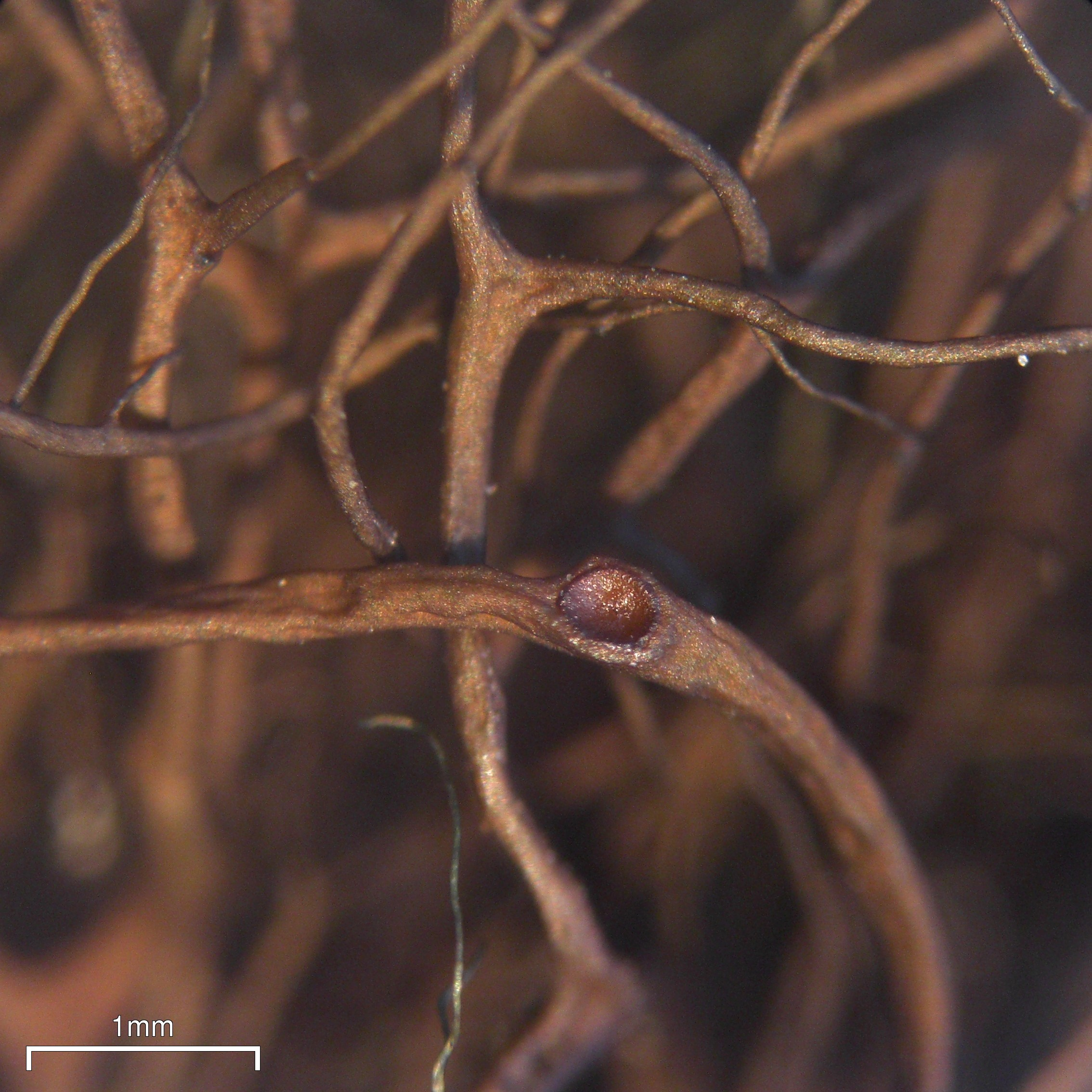
- The budding apothecium of Nodobryoria oregana

Scientific classification
- Kingdom: Fungi
- Division: Ascomycota
- Class: Lecanoromycetes
- Order: Lecanorales
- Family: Parmeliaceae
- Genus: Nodobryoria; Common & Brodo (1995)

Type species
- Nodobryoria abbreviata (Müll.Arg.) Common & Brodo (1995)

Species
- N. abbreviata N. oregana N. subdivergens

= Nodobryoria =

Genus of lichen-forming fungi

Nodobryoria is a genus of medium to large, reddish-brown lichens that are hair-like to shrubby (fruticose) in shape and grow on conifer trees. The genus contains three species, distributed in North America and Greenland, which were previously included in the genus Bryoria. Nodobryoria is similar in appearance to Bryoria, but is differentiated because it does not contain the polysaccharide lichenin (which is present in high quantities in Bryoria), and it has a unique cortex composed of interlocking cells that look like pieces of a jigsaw puzzle when viewed under a light microscope.

== Taxonomy ==
Nodobryoria was established by Ralph Common and Irwin M. Brodo in 1995 as a segregate from Bryoria sect. Subdivergentes, arguing that the section's distinctive blend of characters warranted recognition at genus rank. To avoid ambiguity they described a new genus with its own clear type rather than simply elevating the section, in line with (but not constrained by) ICBN guidance. They restricted the concept to three species—B. abbreviata, B. oregana, and B. subdivergens—excluding B. divergescens from the group, and designated Nodobryoria abbreviata as the type species. The name combines nodo- (for the nodular, jigsaw-like outer cortex) with Bryoria, signalling both the diagnostic cortex and the lineage from which it was split.

== Description ==
Nodobryoria species are fruticose lichens with hanging (pendent) to tufted, much-branched thalli that are dull reddish brown rather than glossy. Branches are generally slender and terete to slightly flattened, with texture that is somewhat brittle. The cortex is distinctive: it has two layers, with an inner band of regularly aligned (periclinal) hyphae and an outer band of very short, irregular, interdigitating cells that form a "jigsaw" or knobby surface when viewed tangentially or with scanning electron microscopy. Unlike many related alectorioid and parmelioid lichens, the cortical surface lacks a continuous shiny polysaccharide coat, which explains the matte appearance; occasional specialised, oil-filled cortical cells are present. Cell-wall chemistry also sets the genus apart: lichenan is absent from the walls (an uncommon state in the Parmeliaceae), while isolichenan-like polysaccharides may occur in low amounts. No phenolic secondary metabolites have been detected in the thallus.

Apothecia, when present, are lecanorine in form with a well-developed, gelatinised proper exciple. The hymenium is relatively low; the epihymenium is brown to reddish-brown and typically unchanged in potassium hydroxide (KOH). Paraphyses are simple to basally branched with distinctly bulbous (capitate), pigmented tips that remain colored after KOH treatment. Asci are of the Parmelia-type and dehisce by forming a short rostrum; a small operculum-like inner flap produced from the ocular chamber lining is often visible at the tip in naturally opened asci. Ascospores are eight per ascus, hyaline, simple, broadly ellipsoid to somewhat spherical (about 5.7–6.8 × 3.5–4.9 μm). Pycnidia are frequent to common, initially immersed and becoming prominent with age; conidia are straight, bifusiform, and about 5–8 × 0.5–0.7 μm.

== Ecology ==
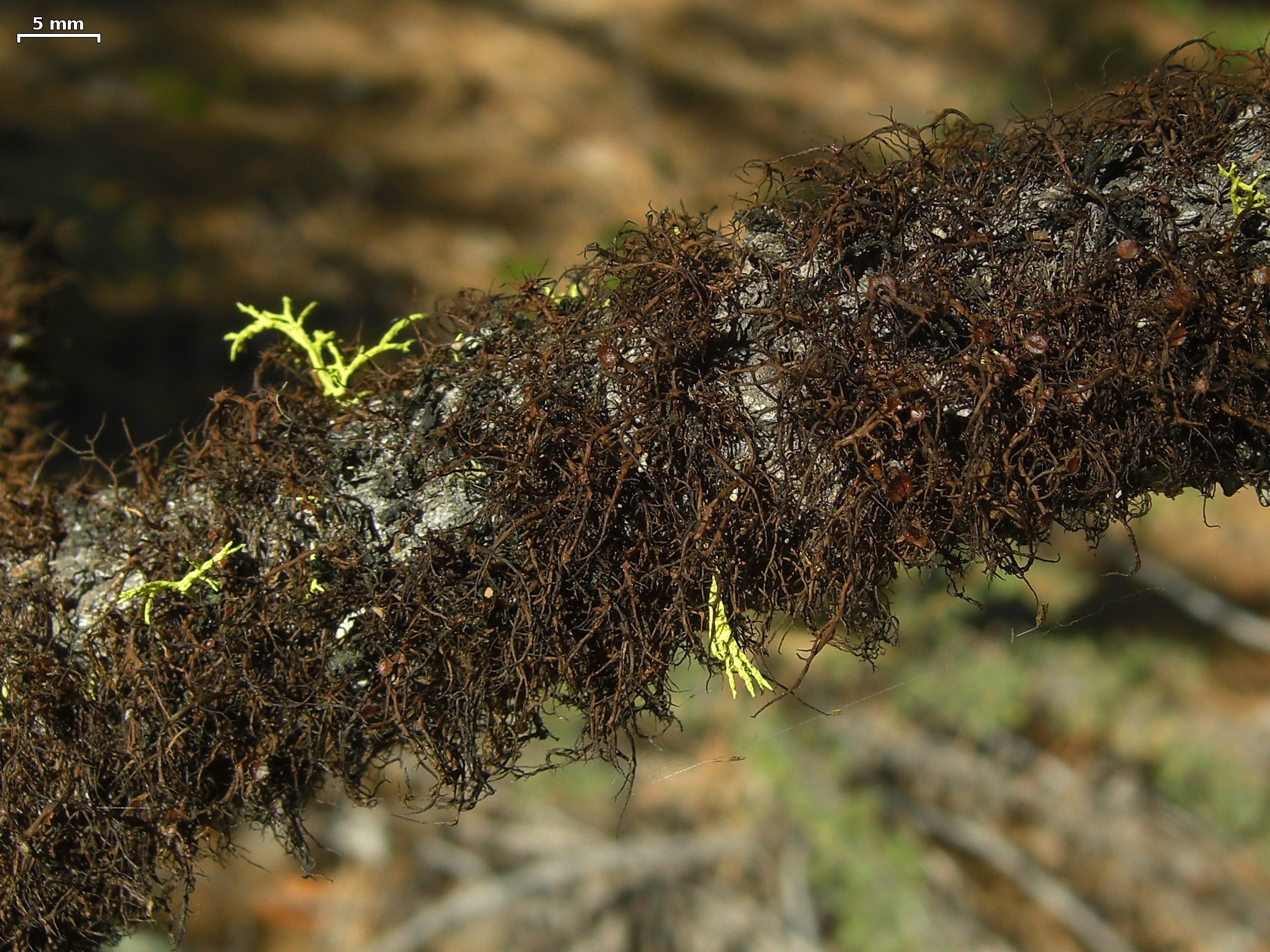
Nodobryoria abbreviata in Satus Pass, Washington

Studies of Nodobryoria distribution in coniferous forests have shown that this melanic hair lichen genus shares ecological preferences with its close relative Bryoria, but has more specialized habitat requirements. Research in British Columbia found that Nodobryoria species, particularly N. oregana and N. abbreviata, achieve their highest abundance on south-facing slopes near mountain summits where sun exposure is intense. However, Nodobryoria tends to be comparatively sparse compared to Bryoria, suggesting a narrower ecological niche. Like other melanic hair lichens, Nodobryoria species possess dark pigments that provide protection against high light exposure, allowing them to colonize sun-exposed habitats. Their restricted distribution pattern, primarily in upper elevation zones with high light intensity, indicates that Nodobryoria may be more specialized for extreme light conditions than the more broadly distributed Bryoria species.

Although sometimes locally common, Nodobryoria rarely develops the heavy canopy loads characteristic of related Bryoria species. In inland temperate rainforests of British Columbia, Canada, N. oregana can occur with moderate abundance, but its contribution to total canopy biomass is minor compared to Bryoria fremontii or B. pseudofuscescens. This lower overall abundance means that while Nodobryoria contributes to the "hair lichen" community, it plays a smaller role in sustaining large herbivores such as woodland caribou.

Lichenoconium christiansenii is a lichenicolous (lichen-dwelling) fungus that has been documented infecting the apothecia of Nodobryoria abbreviata in Washington state.

== Species ==
Three species are accepted in Nodobryoria:

- Nodobryoria abbreviata (Müll.Arg.) Common & Brodo (1995)
- Nodobryoria oregana (Tuck.) Common & Brodo (1995)
- Nodobryoria subdivergens (E.Dahl) Common & Brodo (1995)
