= Bryoria alaskana =

Scientific classification
- Kingdom: Fungi
- Division: Ascomycota
- Class: Lecanoromycetes
- Order: Lecanorales
- Family: Parmeliaceae
- Genus: Bryoria
- Species: B. alaskana

Binomial name
- Bryoria alaskana Goward & Myllys (2016)
- Holotype: Kuiu Island, Alexander Archipelago

Species of lichen

Bryoria alaskana is a species of horsehair lichen in the family Parmeliaceae. First described in 2016, it forms hair-like strands up to 15 cm (6 in) long that hang from tree branches in coastal forests. The species has a distinctive two-part distribution, being found in southeastern Alaska and the Sino-Himalayan Mountains of Asia. In Alaska, it grows primarily in the Alexander Archipelago on various trees including Pacific crabapple, western hemlock, and Sitka spruce. The lichen can be identified by its pale grayish-brown to reddish-brown coloring, evenly divided branching pattern, and white elongated pores on its surface. Though currently known from relatively few locations, researchers suggest it may be more widespread but overlooked due to its similarity to related species.

== Taxonomy ==
Bryoria alaskana was first described in 2016 by the lichenologists Trevor Goward and Leena Myllys. The species belongs to section Bryoria clade 1, a group that includes several amphi-Beringian taxa endemic to East Asia and western North America.

The holotype specimen was collected from Kuiu Island in Alaska's Alexander Archipelago at an elevation of 2 meters. It was found growing on Malus fusca in a beach fringe forest dominated by Tsuga heterophylla and Picea sitchensis. The type specimens are housed at the University of British Columbia Herbarium (UBC; holotype) and the University of Helsinki Herbarium (H; isotype).

Molecular phylogenetics analysis using ITS and MCM7 gene regions shows that B. alaskana forms a strongly supported sister group with specimens tentatively identified as B. carlottae. Unlike most species in Bryoria clade 2 which have broad distributions, B. alaskana exemplifies the more restricted geographic ranges typical of Bryoria clade 1 taxa.

At the time of its description, B. alaskana was known only from southeastern Alaska and the Sino-Himalayan Mountains, suggesting an amphi-Beringian distribution pattern that has been observed in other lichen genera of the family Parmeliaceae.

== Description ==
Bryoria alaskana is a hair-like, highly variable lichen that forms hanging (pendent) strands up to 6–15 cm (2 3/8–5 7/8 in) in length. The main branches are slender, measuring 0.15–0.25 mm in diameter except at the base where they may be thicker. The lichen's overall color ranges from pale grayish-brown to reddish-brown, with secondary branches often appearing paler or creamy in color.

The branching pattern is primarily isotomic, meaning the branches divide into roughly equal parts, though near the tips it may become weakly one-sided (submonopodial). The angles between main branches range from acute to slightly U-shaped. Near the branch tips, short perpendicular side branches up to 2–4 mm (1/16–3/16 in) long can be found, which are either widest at their base or maintain a consistent width throughout.

A distinctive feature of this species is its pseudocyphellae – small pores in the lichen's surface that aid in gas exchange. These appear as white, elongated markings (described as fusiform) that can vary from narrow slits to oval shapes. The pseudocyphellae range from 0.1–1.0 mm in length and 0.03–0.10 mm in width, and may be flat or slightly raised from the surface.

Unlike some related species, B. alaskana lacks specialized reproductive structures like soredia (powdery propagules) or isidia (tiny outgrowths). It also lacks the black dying patches (called emorient patches) that are characteristic of similar species. Neither sexual reproductive structures (apothecia) nor asexual spore-producing structures (conidiomata) have been observed in this species.

When tested with the spot test reagent para-phenylenediamine (Pd), the lichen produces a red reaction, indicating the presence of fumarprotocetraric acid. Additional compounds often present include protocetraric and confumarprotocetraric acids, though these chemicals require laboratory testing to detect.

== Habitat and distribution ==
Bryoria alaskana has a disjunct distribution pattern, being found in two widely separated regions: southeastern Alaska and the Sino-Himalayan Mountains of Asia. This geographic pattern, known as amphi-Beringian distribution, is shared by several other lichen species in the family Parmeliaceae and is thought to reflect ancient land connections between Asia and North America during the Pleistocene period.

In North America, the species has been documented from several locations: Kuiu Island (including the type locality at Tebenkof Bay); Prince of Wales Island (South Prince of Wales Wilderness); and Gut Island (Stikine/LeConte Wilderness). These areas are characterized by extreme maritime influence, particularly southeastern Alaska's intensely coastal areas that experience very high rainfall, frequent fog, and mild temperatures year-round. Within these perpetually moist environments, it grows as an epiphyte (an organism that grows on plants) on both coniferous and deciduous trees. Its typical habitat is beach fringe forests, where it can be found growing on the branches of trees and shrubs, particularly on the Pacific crabapple (Malus fusca), Western hemlock (Tsuga heterophylla), and Sitka spruce (Picea sitchensis).

In Asia, the species has been documented in the Sino-Himalayan Mountains, where it has been found growing on fir trees (Abies species). However, the full extent of its Asian distribution remains to be determined, as the species was only recently described and may have been overlooked in other locations. Despite its currently known limited distribution, researchers suggest that B. alaskana may be more widespread than current records indicate. Its similarity to other Bryoria species and the challenging nature of lichen identification may have led to it being overlooked or misidentified in other suitable habitats within its range.

The species appears to prefer humid, coastal environments with good air circulation, typical of the North Pacific coast. These conditions are similar to those favored by other members of Bryoria clade 1, which tend to have more restricted geographic ranges compared to their relatives in Bryoria clade 2.
