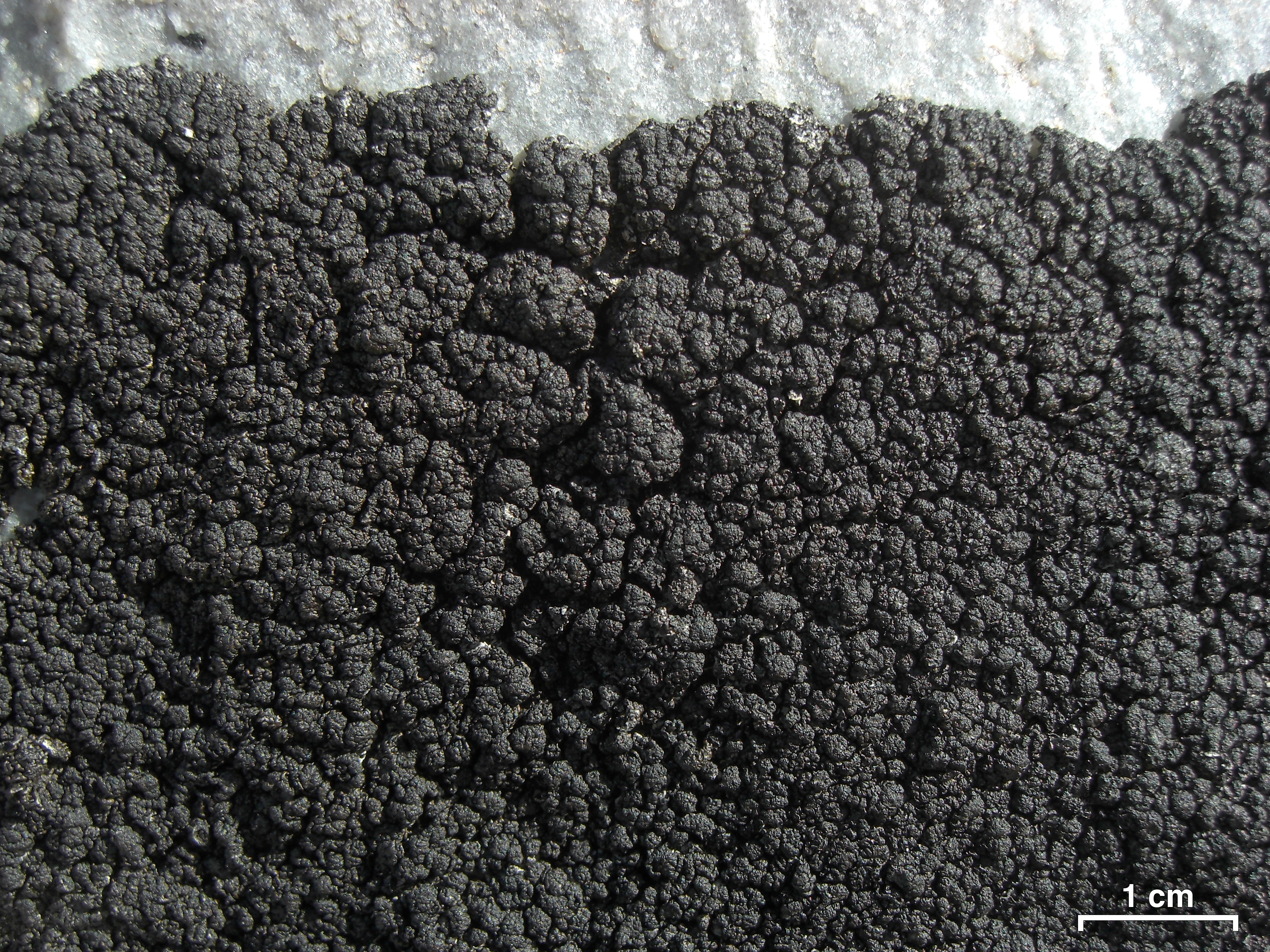
- Pseudephebe minuscula

Scientific classification
- Kingdom: Fungi
- Division: Ascomycota
- Class: Lecanoromycetes
- Order: Lecanorales
- Family: Parmeliaceae
- Genus: Pseudephebe; M.Choisy (1930)

Type species
- Pseudephebe pubescens (L.) M.Choisy (1930)

Species
- P. mariensis P. minuscula P. pubescens

= Pseudephebe =

Genus of fungi

Pseudephebe is a genus of fruticose lichens in the family Parmeliaceae. It contains three species that grow on rocks.

== Taxonomy ==
Pseudephebe was circumscribed by French lichenologist Maurice Choisy in 1930. Molecular phylogenetic work published in 2016 showed that the genus is monophyletic, and within the alectorioid clade of the family Parmeliaceae. This clade includes the genera Alectoria, Bryocaulon, Bryoria, and Nodobryoria. P. mariensis was added to the genus in 2019, transferred from the genus Bryoria. Although Boluda and colleagues considered this to be synonymous with P. minuscula, Fryday and colleagues "consider the distinct pseudocyphellae, detectable norstictic acid, thick cortex and the unique propagule system of the Falklands collections as sufficient to provisionally maintain it as a distinct species."

== Description ==
Pseudephebe lichens are small and fruticose, ranging in colour from brown to almost black. Their thalli somewhat resembles coarse, tangled hair, although sometimes regions around the periphery of thallus have flattened branches that are almost foliose. Pseudocyphellae, isidia, and soredia are not present on the thallus. Ascospores are colourless, and measure 7–12 by 6–8 μm. All lichen spot tests are negative.

== Habitat and distribution ==
Pseudephebe grows on siliceous rocks. It is a cool-temperate to arctic genus.

== Species ==
- Pseudephebe mariensis (Øvstedal, Common & Fryday) Øvstedal & Fryday (2019)
- Pseudephebe minuscula (Nyl. ex Arnold) Brodo & D.Hawksw. (1977)
- Pseudephebe pubescens (L.) M.Choisy (1930)
