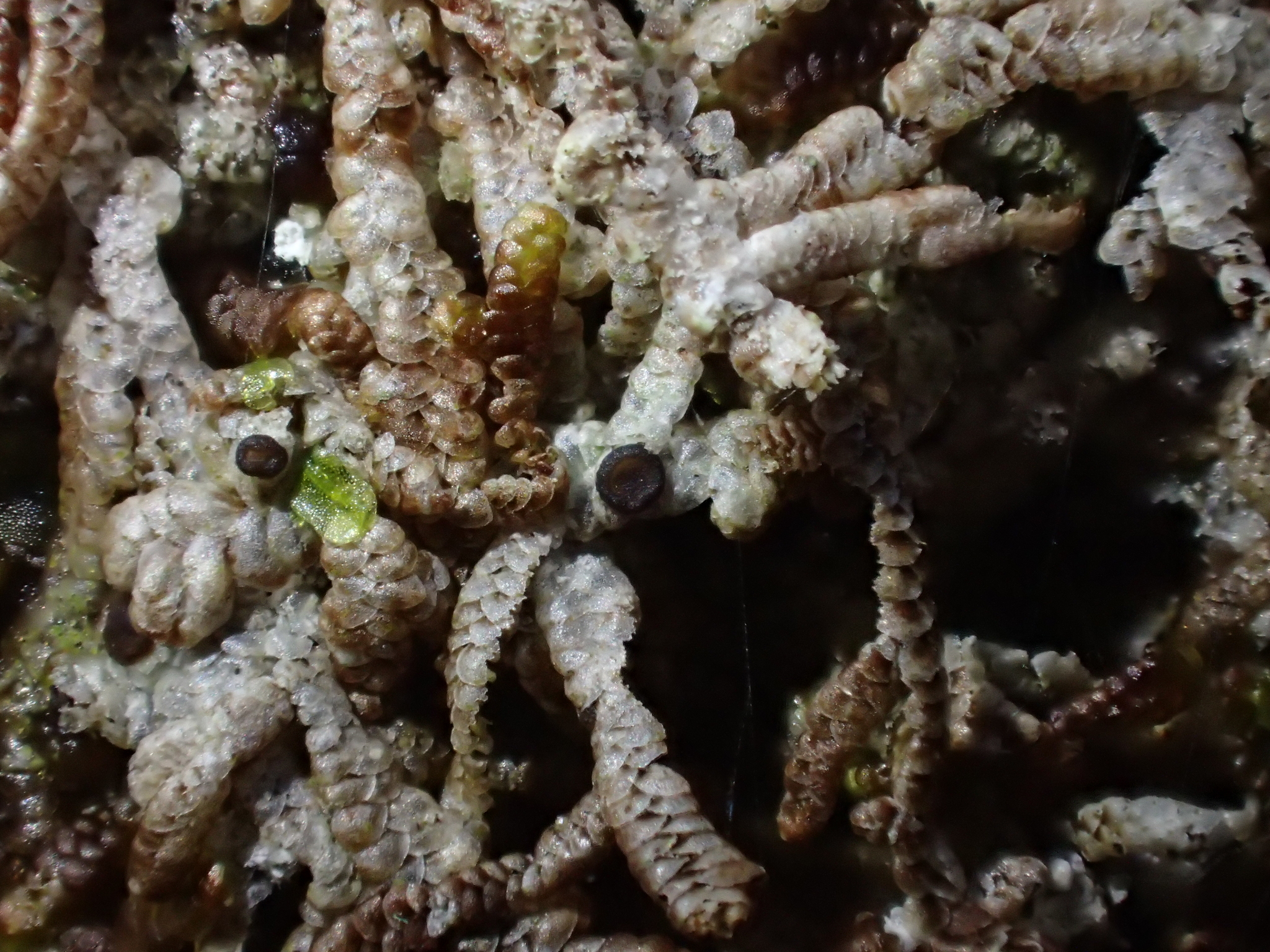
- Catinaria atropurpurea on Frullania tamarisci

Scientific classification
- Domain: Eukaryota
- Kingdom: Fungi
- Division: Ascomycota
- Class: Lecanoromycetes
- Order: Lecanorales
- Family: Ramalinaceae
- Genus: Catinaria; Vain. (1922)

Type species
- Catinaria montana (Nyl.) Vain. 1922

= Catinaria =

Genus of lichen-forming fungi

Catinaria is a genus of lichen-forming fungi in the family Ramalinaceae. These lichens form very thin, often barely visible crusts on bark, rock, or moss, and are recognizable by their small, round, reddish-brown to black fruiting bodies that sit flush with the surface. The genus includes eight known species, some of which grow specifically on liverworts and can behave almost like decomposer fungi.

== Taxonomy ==
The genus was circumscribed by the Finnish lichenologist Edvard August Vainio in 1922, with Catinaria montana assigned as the type species. Vainio's original description emphasized the genus's distinctive combination of features: a dark, crusty thallus with a prominent raised margin, club-shaped spore-producing structures (asci), and small elliptical ascospores measuring about 8–9 micrometres long. He distinguished Catinaria from the closely related genus Lecidea based on these morphological characteristics, particularly the thallus structure and spore dimensions.

== Description ==
Catinaria species form very thin crusts on bark, rock or, in a few cases, directly on mosses, where the fungus can behave almost like a saprotroph. The surface is usually granular or broken into inconspicuous microscopic islands; in some specimens the thallus is so scant that it appears absent altogether. There is no protective outer skin (cortex) and the crust never produces the powdery reproductive patches (soralia) common in many lichens, although one still-unnamed species develops tiny finger-like isidia. The photosynthetic partner is a globose green alga of the Dictyochloropsis group.

The sexual structures are small, round apothecia that sit flush with, or slightly raised above, the thallus. They begin reddish-brown and may darken to dull black with age. Because the apothecia lack a rim of thallus tissue, the disc merges directly into the true exciple—a cup wall built from radiating hyphae that is initially the same colour as the disc but may turn darker and eventually erode away. Inside, the spore layer is threaded by slender paraphyses whose tips swell slightly and often carry a coloured cap. The asci hold eight to sixteen ascospores; they are "Catillaria-type", meaning their upper dome stains a uniform blue in iodine rather than showing a differentiated inlay. Spores are ellipsoid, colourless and usually divided by a single cross-wall (very rarely three); each is wrapped in a closely fitting gelatinous envelope (perispore) that remains clear under the microscope. No asexual conidia have yet been reported, and thin-layer chromatography has so far failed to detect any diagnostic lichen products. The combination of spores with a compact perispore and the simple, undifferentiated ascus apex separates Catinaria from superficially similar crustose genera such as Catillaria, Megalaria and Phyllopsora.

== Species ==
- Catinaria atropurpurea (Schaer.) Vězda & Poelt (1981)
- Catinaria brodoana R.C.Harris & W.R.Buck (2016)
- Catinaria isidioides Sanderson, P.F.Cannon & Aptroot (2024)
- Catinaria montana (Nyl.) Vain. (1922)
- Catinaria neuschildii (Körb.) P.James (1965)
- Catinaria occidentalis Van den Boom (2020)
- Catinaria radulae R.C.Harris & W.R.Buck (2016)
- Catinaria subcorallina (Zahlbr.) Brako (1987)
