= Catinaria brodoana =

Scientific classification
- Kingdom: Fungi
- Division: Ascomycota
- Class: Lecanoromycetes
- Order: Lecanorales
- Family: Ramalinaceae
- Genus: Catinaria
- Species: C. brodoana

Binomial name
- Catinaria brodoana R.C.Harris & W.R.Buck (2016)

Species of lichen-forming fungus

Catinaria brodoana is a species of lichen-forming fungus in the family Ramalinaceae. It is a tiny, liverwort-dwelling species that grows on Cheilolejeunea liverworts in humid forests of the southeastern United States. The lichen has small black fruiting bodies and a thallus reduced to pale green granules that are largely hidden among the host's leaves.

== Taxonomy ==
Catinaria brodoana was described in 2016 by Richard C. Harris and William R. Buck as a hepaticolous (liverwort-dwelling) member of the lichen-forming fungus genus Catinaria. It was characterized and delimited through comparison with the genus type, C. atropurpurea, but differs in being host-specific on species of Cheilolejeunea sect. Leucolejeunea and in having a thallus made up of goniocysts, a distinctly cellular exciple, and ascospores with a weakly warted perispore. The species epithet honors the lichenologist Irwin M. Brodo.

== Description ==
The thallus is usually inconspicuous on the host and is mainly evident as small, bead-like, translucent to pale green granules (goniocysts, about 22–42 μm across) tucked among the leaves of the liverwort. The algal partner (photobiont) is a chlorococcoid green alga (cells about 6–9 μm across). The apothecia (fruiting bodies) are black and small (about 0.20–0.35 mm in diameter), at first somewhat top-shaped (turbinate) and later flattening to disc-shaped, with a persistent raised margin. The outer rim of the apothecium (exciple) is brown with darker pigmentation and a cellular structure, and the spore-bearing layer (hymenium) is colourless (hyaline) and not permeated by oil droplets (not oil-inspersed). The asci are of the Catillaria-type, each containing eight colourless, 2-celled (1-septate) ascospores measuring about 9.5–16.0 × 5.0–7.5 μm, with a finely warted outer wall (epispore). Pycnidia (asexual fruiting bodies) have not been observed. Standard spot tests and thin-layer chromatography on limited material detected no lichen substances.

== Habitat and distribution ==
This species grows directly on the thalli of Cheilolejeunea sect. Leucolejeunea liverworts, most often on C. clypeata and C. conchifolia but also recorded on C. unciloba. The liverwort hosts typically occur as epiphytes on tree bark in humid forests. Catinaria brodoana is known from the southeastern United States, where it has been collected in swamp forests of the coastal plain (including cypress- and tupelo-dominated systems) and at low elevations in parts of the southern Appalachian Mountains. The apparent gap between the coastal plain and mountain populations may reflect a genuinely disjunct distribution, though the species could easily be overlooked in intervening areas because of its minute size and its tendency to blend into the host liverwort. It has been recorded from Alabama, Georgia, North Carolina, South Carolina, and Tennessee.
