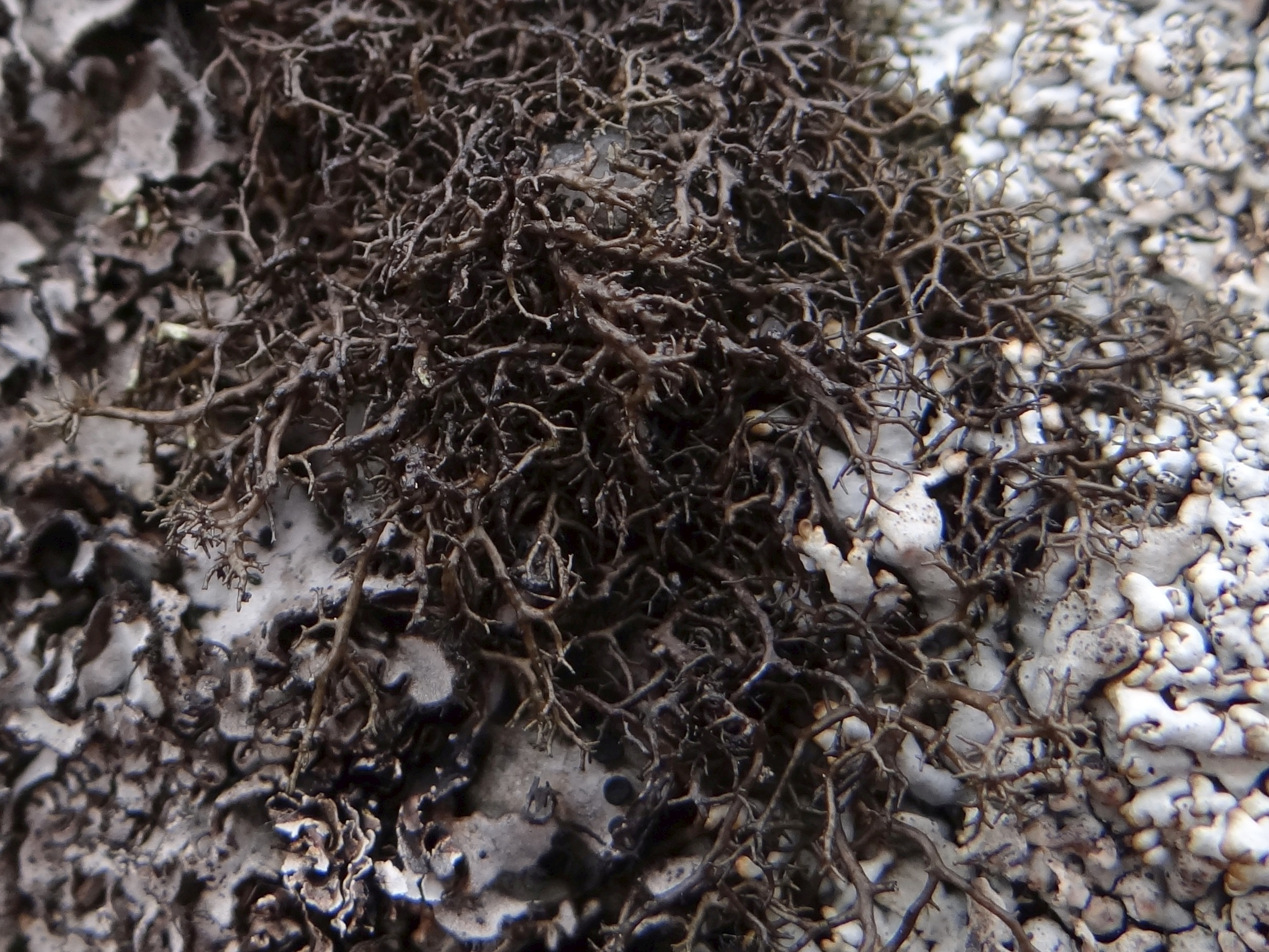

Conservation status
- Secure (NatureServe)

Scientific classification
- Kingdom: Fungi
- Division: Ascomycota
- Class: Lecanoromycetes
- Order: Lecanorales
- Family: Parmeliaceae
- Genus: Pseudephebe
- Species: P. pubescens

Binomial name
- Pseudephebe pubescens (L.) M.Choisy (1930)

= Pseudephebe pubescens =

Species of lichen-forming fungus

Pseudephebe pubescens, also known as 'fine rock wool', is a temperate alpine lichen. It is a member of the genus Pseudephebe, a lichen group characterized by dense mats of brown to near-black "hairs".

== Taxonomy ==
Linnaeus first described Lichen pubescens in 1753. Maurice Choisy transferred it to the genus Pseudephebe in 1930. It is usually distinguished from P. minuscula due to P. pubescens preferring a moister habitat, and its branches are more terete and lack the irregularities of P. minuscula. The morphological and ecological differences between the two species are often overlapping, and it can be difficult to truly distinguish the two without molecular analysis.

== Description ==
Pseudephebe pubescens is a fruticose lichen that forms decumbent mats made of isotomic-dichotomous branching thalli. The branching occurs frequently and weaves around itself, leading to the woolen appearance. Dark brown to black in color and shiny. Apothecia are rare, but are rarely greater than 6 mm in diameter and have the same appearance as the rest of the thallus. The species lacks isidia, soredia, and pseudocyphellae. Pycnidia occur in great numbers on tubercles with conspicuous ostioles. It is not known to produce any secondary metabolites.

== Habitat and distribution ==
Pseudephebe pubescens is found specifically on acidic or silicate rocks in temperate-alpine or sub-arctic regions. It has circumpolar sightings, being found from the Canadian territories, throughout the United States, and sometimes in alpine Mexico. It has been known in Europe, but recently discovered in China and even been found in the Andes and in Australia. It has been known to grow upon wood occasionally. Pseudephebe pubescens tends to be in more temperate environments than P. minuscula.

== See also ==
- List of lichens named by Carl Linnaeus
