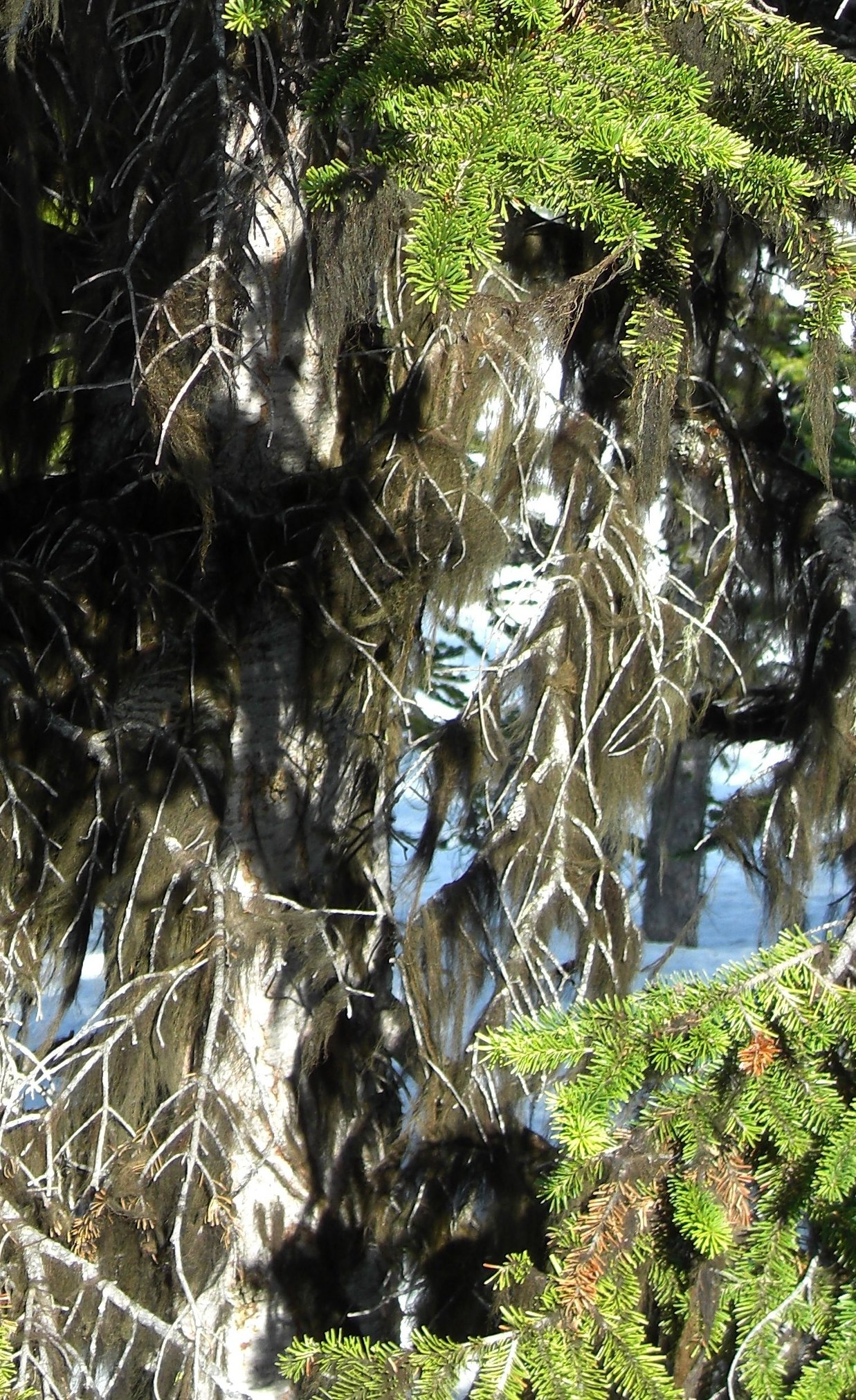

Conservation status
- Secure (NatureServe)

Scientific classification
- Domain: Eukaryota
- Kingdom: Fungi
- Division: Ascomycota
- Class: Lecanoromycetes
- Order: Lecanorales
- Family: Parmeliaceae
- Genus: Bryoria
- Species: B. fuscescens

Binomial name
- Bryoria fuscescens (Gyeln.) Brodo & D.Hawksw. (1977)

Synonyms
- Alectoria fuscescens Gyeln. (1932)

= Bryoria fuscescens =

Species of lichen

Bryoria fuscescens is a species of lichen of the family Parmeliaceae.

As of July 2021, its conservation status has not been estimated by the IUCN. In Iceland, where it grows as an epiphyte on downy birch stems and branches, it is classified as a vulnerable species (VU).
