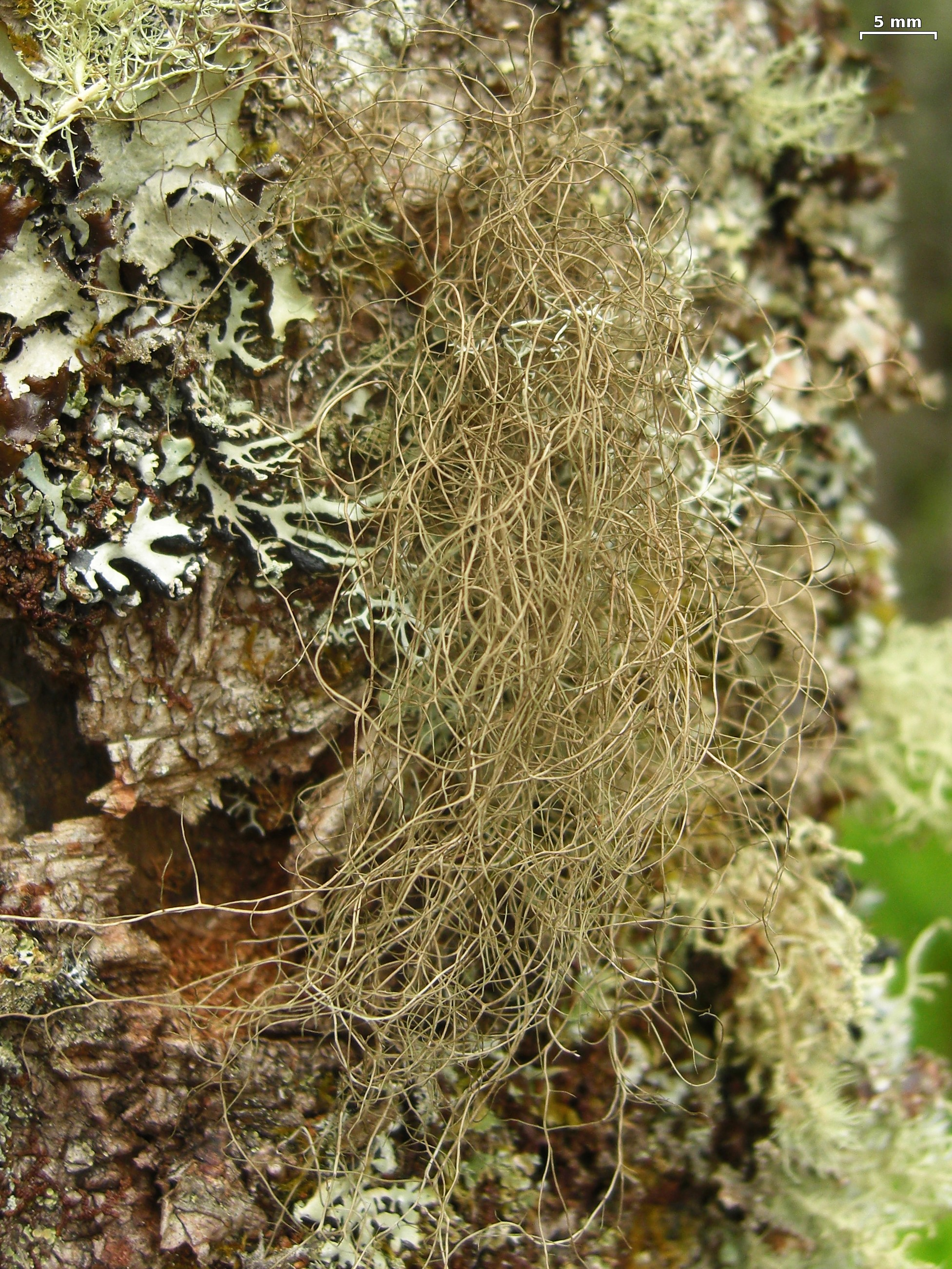

Conservation status
- Secure (NatureServe)

Scientific classification
- Kingdom: Fungi
- Division: Ascomycota
- Class: Lecanoromycetes
- Order: Lecanorales
- Family: Parmeliaceae
- Genus: Bryoria
- Species: B. nadvornikiana

Binomial name
- Bryoria nadvornikiana (Gyeln.) Brodo & D.Hawksw. (1977)

Synonyms
- Alectoria nadvornikiana Gyeln. (1932)

= Bryoria nadvornikiana =

Species of lichen-forming fungus

Bryoria nadvornikiana, commonly known as the spiny grey horsehair lichen or the blonde horsehair lichen, is a species of horsehair lichen in the family Parmeliaceae.

In Nepal, B. nadvornikiana has been reported from 3,800 to 3,900 m elevation in a compilation of published records.
