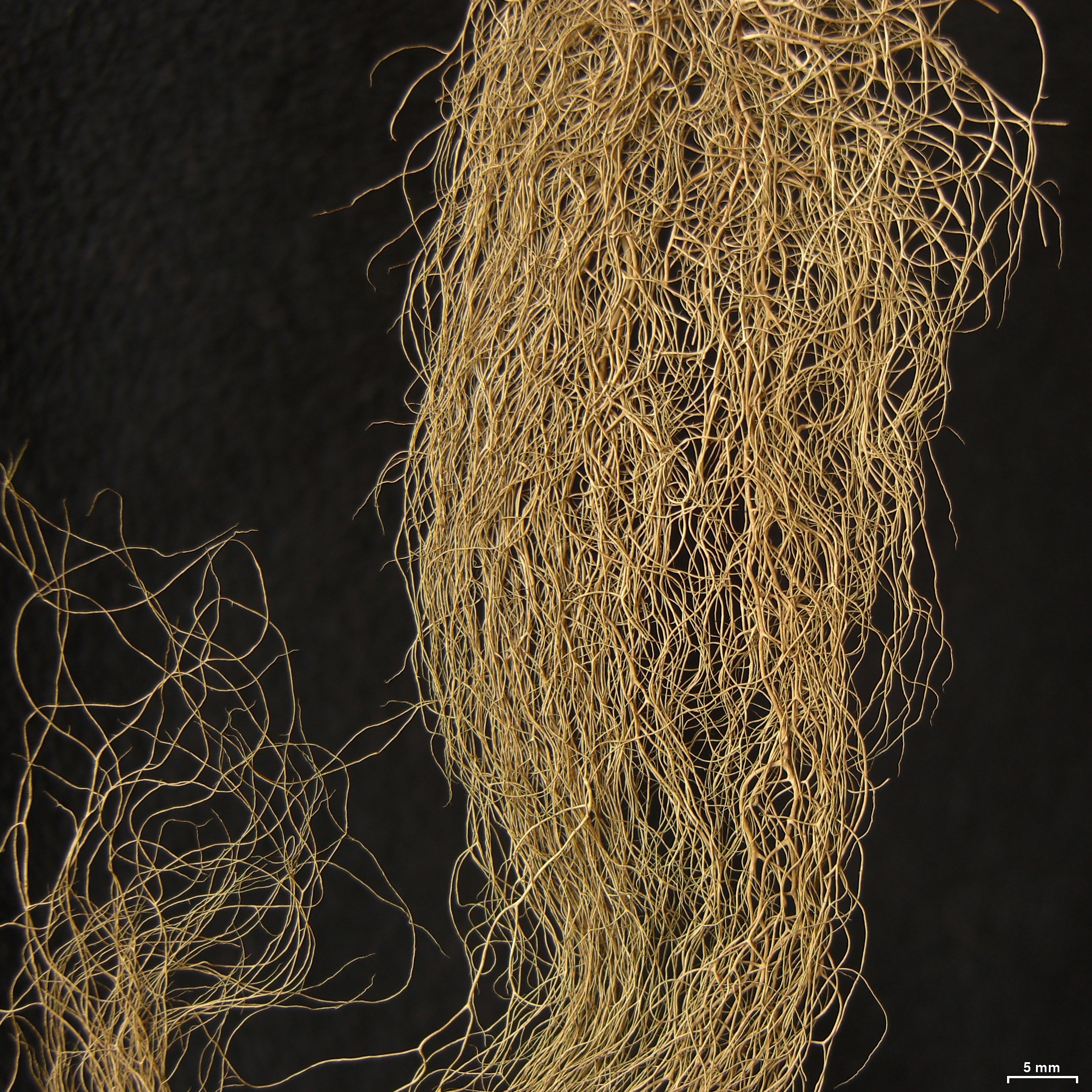
- B. pseudofuscescens found in Fourth of July Pass, Idaho

Conservation status
- Secure (NatureServe)

Scientific classification
- Kingdom: Fungi
- Division: Ascomycota
- Class: Lecanoromycetes
- Order: Lecanorales
- Family: Parmeliaceae
- Genus: Bryoria
- Species: B. pseudofuscescens

Binomial name
- Bryoria pseudofuscescens (Gyeln.) Brodo & D.Hawksw. (1977)

Synonyms
- Alectoria pseudofuscescens Gyeln. (1934); Bryopogon pseudofuscescens (Gyeln.) Gyeln. (1935)

= Bryoria pseudofuscescens =

Species of lichen-forming fungus

Bryoria pseudofuscescens is a species of fruticose lichen in the family Parmeliaceae.
