= Cladonia graeca =

Scientific classification
- Domain: Eukaryota
- Kingdom: Fungi
- Division: Ascomycota
- Class: Lecanoromycetes
- Order: Lecanorales
- Family: Cladoniaceae
- Genus: Cladonia
- Species: C. graeca

Binomial name
- Cladonia graeca Sipman & Ahti (2011)

Species of lichen

Cladonia graeca is a species of saxicolous (rock-dwelling), fruticose lichen in the family Cladoniaceae. Found in Greece, it was formally described as a new species in 2011 by lichenologists Harrie Sipman and Teuvo Ahti. The type specimen was collected by Sipman and Thomas Raus from the summit area of Mount Ochi (Euboea), at an altitude of 1,370 m (4,490 ft); it has also been recorded on the island Thasos. The small and inconspicuous lichen grows on boulders and cliffs of siliceous schist, especially in areas where downward-trickling water collects in dwarf shrub vegetation. It is similar to C. macrophylla and C. decorticata, but differs chemically from those species, as it contains fumarprotocetraric acid rather than psoromic acid or perlatolic acid.

== Description ==
Cladonia graeca has a persistent primary thallus (the first-formed body of the lichen) composed of squamules (small, scale-like structures) measuring 2–3 mm in length and 0.5–2 mm in width. These squamules are flat or recurved with a brown to dark green, shiny upper surface and a white to lilac, somewhat cottony lower surface. The podetia (upright stalks) grow 0.5–2 cm tall and 0.5–1 mm thick, appearing erect to curved, pointed (subulate), and either unbranched or sparsely branched. They range in colour from brown to whitish, with sterile tips that are pointed (acuminate) and fertile tips that are blunt (obtuse).

The surface of the podetia lacks soredia (powdery propagules) but is densely covered with phyllidia (small leaf-like outgrowths) that point downward, measuring about 0.1 mm long. These phyllidia appear either bullate (bubble-like) or attached as plates and easily shed from the upper parts of the podetia, leaving the white medulla (inner layer) exposed. The podetial wall is thick, with the cortex (outer protective layer) either absent or transformed into phyllidia. The medulla is thin, while the stereome (supporting tissue) is thick and hard, surrounding a narrow central canal.

The conidiomata (asexual reproductive structures) form at the tips of the podetia, appearing ovoid and black, though mature specimens were not observed. Similarly, the hymenial discs (sexual reproductive structures) are probably brown but were not seen in maturity. Chemical analysis reveals the presence of fumarprotocetraric acid and traces of protocetraric acid. When tested with chemical spot tests, the lichen shows a Pd+ (red) reaction, as well as K− and KC−.

== See also ==
- List of Cladonia species
