= Bryoria araucana =

Scientific classification
- Domain: Eukaryota
- Kingdom: Fungi
- Division: Ascomycota
- Class: Lecanoromycetes
- Order: Lecanorales
- Family: Parmeliaceae
- Genus: Bryoria
- Species: B. araucana

Binomial name
- Bryoria araucana Boluda, D.Hawksw. & V.J.Rico (2015)

Species of lichen

Bryoria araucana is a species of lichen in the genus Bryoria.

== Etymology ==
Bryoria araucana was named after the IX Región de la Araucanía in Chile, which is the only known area for the species, as was the case in the name Araucaria araucana.

== Description ==
Thallus pendent to subpendent, 6–12 cm long; isotomic to anisotomic dichotomously branched, angles between dichotomies mainly obtuse, rarely acute; branches terete, even, main branches at base 0.2–0.4 mm diameter, tips to 0.1 mm diameter; terminal portions with few lateral branchlets acutely inserted. Surface dark grey to dark greyish brown, shiny, base ordinarily black; cortex prosoplectenchymatous. Soralia and isidia are lacking. The pseudocyphellae are inconspicuous, depressed, fusiform, concolorous to slightly darker than the thallus, sometimes faintly pruinose, straight or twisted, up to 1.5 mm long. The photobiont is trebouxioid. Apothecia and conidiomata are unknown. Chemistry. Inner cortex and medulla C−, K−, KC−, PD+ yellow turning red, sometimes faint. TLC: fumarprotocetraric acid is the main substance, with protocetraric and confumarprotocetraric acids in trace amounts.

== Habitat and distribution ==
Known only from the type locality and immediate surroundings, in Chile, IX Región de La Araucanía, Provincia de Cautín, Comuna de Melipeuco, Conguillío National Park, growing on Araucaria araucana trunks.
