= Bryoria implexa =

Scientific classification
- Kingdom: Fungi
- Division: Ascomycota
- Class: Lecanoromycetes
- Order: Lecanorales
- Family: Parmeliaceae
- Genus: Bryoria
- Species: B. implexa

Binomial name
- Bryoria implexa (Hoffm.) Brodo & D.Hawksw. 1977

Synonyms
- Usnea jubata tax.vag. implexa Hoffm. (1796)

Species of lichen-forming fungus

Bryoria implexa is a species of horsehair lichen in the family Parmeliaceae.

== Habit ==
Bryoria implexa has a dark brown or olive colour. The thallus is cylindrical and hairlike, 5–10 cm long and hanging. The main branches are 0.2-0.3 mm in diameter but the narrower branches are 0.1 mm.

== Distribution and habitat ==
The native distribution of Bryorya implexa is North-America and Europe, including Iceland where it has only been found in one location, Gálgahraun in Álftanes, where its preferred habitat is lava rock. In Nepal, Bryoria implexa has been reported from 3,700 to 4,000 m elevation in a compilation of published records.

== Conservation status ==
Bryoria implexa is red listed in Iceland as critically endangered (CR) due to it being found in only one location in the country. The species is extinct (EX) in Britain.

As of April 2021, its conservation status has not been estimated by the IUCN.

== Chemistry ==
Bryoria implexa contains norstictic acid.
