= Lichenoconium christiansenii =

Scientific classification
- Kingdom: Fungi
- Division: Ascomycota
- Class: Dothideomycetes
- Order: Lichenoconiales
- Family: Lichenoconiaceae
- Genus: Lichenoconium
- Species: L. christiansenii

Binomial name
- Lichenoconium christiansenii M.S.Cole & D.Hawksw. (2004)

Species of lichen

Lichenoconium christiansenii is a species of lichenicolous (lichen-dwelling) fungus in the family Lichenoconiaceae. Found in North America, where it grows on the fruiting bodies of Nodobryoria abbreviata, it was described as a new species in 2004 by Mariette S. Cole and David Leslie Hawksworth.

== Taxonomy ==
The type specimen of Lichenoconium christiansenii was collected in Yakima County, Washington, within the Yakima Indian Reservation. It was found on the southeastern slope of Mount Adams, at an elevation of 6,000 ft (1,800 m), growing in the apothecia (fruiting bodies) of Nodobryoria abbreviata on fallen conifer branches within a forest dominated by Abies amabilis and Picea engelmannii. The species epithet honors the Danish botanist M. Skytte Christiansen, who sent the type specimen to Hawksworth for study in 1991.

== Description ==
Lichenoconium christiansenii produces small, black, and shiny reproductive structures known as pycnidia. These structures develop individually, with only the uppermost portion becoming exposed at maturity. The pycnidia are nearly spherical, measuring between 75 and 150 μm in diameter, and lack a papilla (a protruding tip). A distinct opening, or ostiole, is present at the top, ranging from 30 to 50 μm wide, allowing the release of spores.

The outer wall of the pycnidia consists of 2–5 layers of cells, with a thickness of 9–12.5 μm in the lower and lateral portions, increasing to 13.5–19 μm around the ostiole. The wall is pale brown at the base but darkens towards the exposed upper region. The cells forming the wall are irregularly shaped, often angular or rounded, and become compressed in a radial pattern.

The fungal mycelium, or network of hyphae, is not extensively developed and remains embedded within the host tissue, confined to the area immediately surrounding the pycnidia. The hyphae are pale brown, uneven in width, and feature internal divisions (septa), measuring 3–3.5 μm thick.

Inside the pycnidia, specialized spore-producing cells (asci) form a single layer lining the lower two-thirds of the cavity. These cells are short and flask-shaped with well-developed necks and are transparent (hyaline), measuring 5–7.5 μm in length and 3–4.5 μm in width. The spores (conidia) develop singly at the tips of these cells and are not arranged in chains.

The conidia are abundant, accumulating in a dry mass within the pycnidia before dispersal. They are nearly spherical (subglobose), measuring 6.5–7.5 μm in length and 5–5.5 μm in width. The base of each conidium has a sharply defined, truncated edge with a frilled margin left from its detachment. The spores are dark brown, appearing nearly black in dense masses, and have a finely warted surface.

== Habitat, distribution, and ecology ==
Lichenoconium christiansenii is known to grow exclusively on the apothecia of Nodobryoria abbreviata. Despite the presence of numerous fungal reproductive structures (conidiomata) on the host's fruiting bodies, the apothecial discs remain unaffected in color or appearance. The conidiomata are primarily confined to the upper layers of the hymenium, rarely extending into deeper tissues. Mycelial growth is limited to the immediate vicinity of the fungal structures and does not spread throughout the host. These characteristics suggest that L. christiansenii has a commensalistic relationship with its host, meaning it benefits from the association without causing significant harm, rather than acting as a parasite or decomposer.

The species is known only from its type locality in the Pacific Northwest of North America, specifically Washington State. Its host, Nodobryoria abbreviata, is endemic to dry inland conifer forests, with a range extending from Baja California in the south to southern British Columbia in the north.
