= Basket Island =

Island in Cumberland, Maine, United States

Coordinates: 43°44′04″N 70°10′01″W

Basket Island is an uninhabited Casco Bay island that is part of the town of Cumberland, Maine. Basket Island was among a number of Casco Bay islands owned by Arctic explorer Robert Peary, and is maintained today as a nature preserve that is open to the public for daytrips.

== Geography, topography and ecology ==
Basket Island is located off the southern tip of Cousins Island and west of Great Chebeague Island.

Basket Island totals 10 acres of land, with a sand beach and three shale beaches.

The island's trees include American beech, balsam fir, oak, paper birch, red maple, red spruce and trembling aspen. Other fauna including alternate-leaf dogwood, bayberry, beach rose, milkwood, poison ivy, raspberry, speckled alder, staghorn sumac, viburnum and witch hazel.

Basket Island is near ledges where boats have gone aground on multiple occasions, including ferries operated by Casco Bay Lines.

== History ==
In 1733, residents of North Yarmouth voted to give ownership of Basket Island and Bustins Island to John Powell, one of several members of a Boston committee that had overseen the resettlement of North Yarmouth after hostilities with the Abenaki peoples resulted in the loss of land records.

Robert Peary purchased Basket Island in 1907 from the estate of a prior owner in Portland, Maine, and gave the island to his wife Josephine. It was one of at least 16 Casco Bay islands acquired by Peary, including Eagle Island off Harpswell Neck where the Peary family lived.

Ownership of Basket Island passed to Robert E. Peary Jr., who in 1958 deeded the island to Elisabeth Brown Dessau. Dessau donated the island in 1967 to the Nature Conservancy. In 1992, ownership of Basket Island passed to the Chebeague & Cumberland Land Trust, which has maintained it since as a nature preserve. Island artifacts include a foundation, remnants of a stone pier, and a concrete base for a World War II-era signal apparatus.

In a statute authorizing the 2007 secession of Chebeague Island from Cumberland to form an independent municipality, the Maine State Legislature included Basket Island and nearby Sturdivant Island as staying under the municipal jurisdiction of Cumberland.

Multiple aquaculture businesses have established shellfish or sugar kelp cultivation operations in the immediate vicinity of Basket Island.
