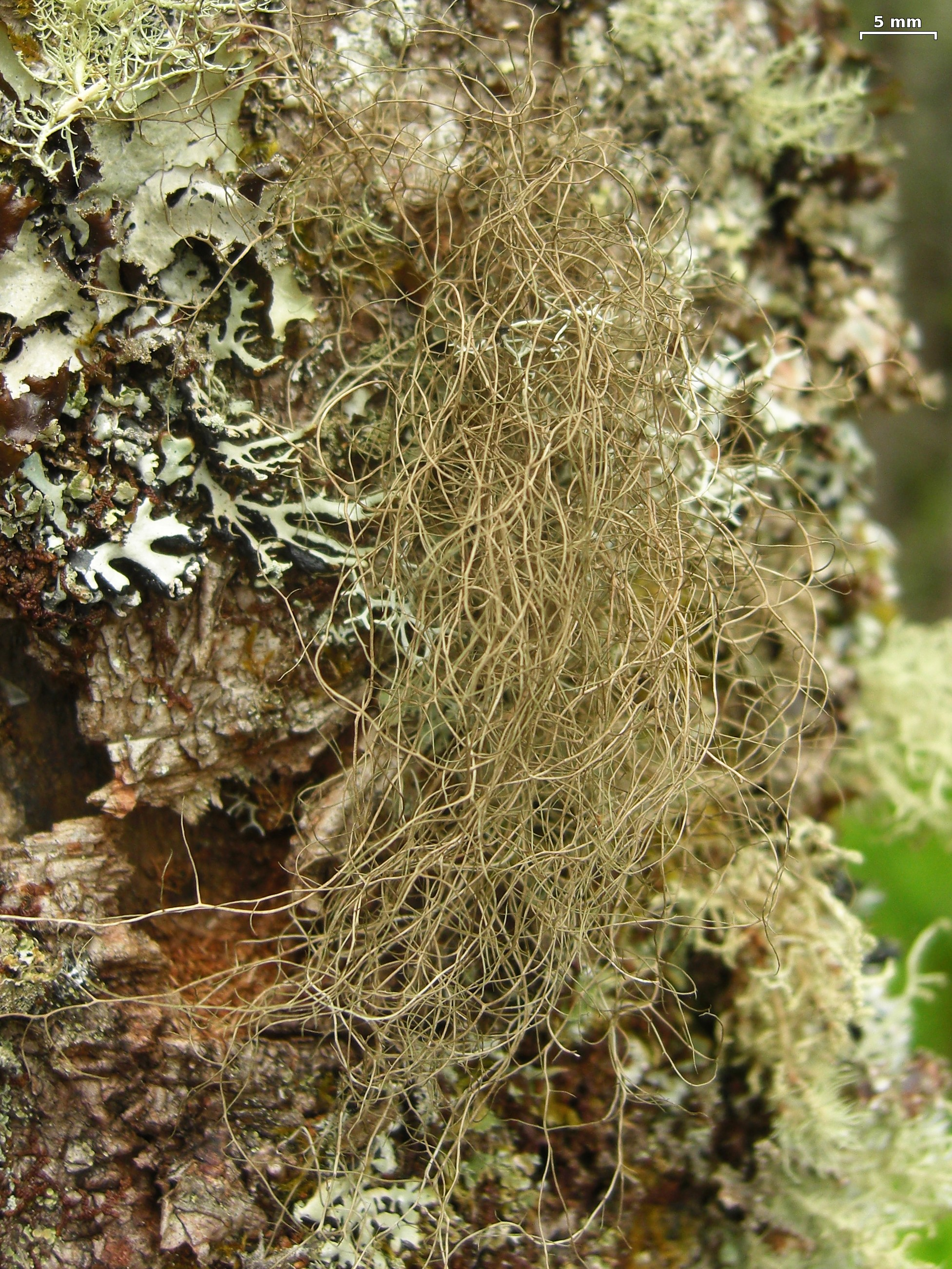
- Bryoria nadvornikiana

Scientific classification
- Kingdom: Fungi
- Division: Ascomycota
- Class: Lecanoromycetes
- Order: Lecanorales
- Family: Parmeliaceae
- Genus: Bryoria; Brodo & D.Hawksw. (1977)

Type species
- Bryoria trichodes (Michx.) Brodo & D.Hawksw. (1977)

Synonyms
- Bryopogon Th.Fr. (1860); Setaria Ach. ex Michx. (1803)

= Bryoria =

Genus of fungi

Bryoria is a genus of lichenized fungi in the family Parmeliaceae. Many members of this genus are known as horsehair lichens. The genus has a widespread distribution, especially in boreal and cool temperate areas. These lichens typically grow as slender, hair-like strands that hang from conifer trees or form small bushes, ranging in colour from dark brown to pale grey. They play important ecological roles, particularly as winter food for caribou in northern forests, where some species can accumulate in large quantities in the forest canopy. The genus contains about 35 species found worldwide, with ongoing discoveries of new species especially in mountainous regions of Asia and western North America.

== Taxonomy ==
Bryoria was circumscribed in 1977 by lichenologists Irwin Brodo and David Hawksworth, with Bryoria trichodes as the type species.

Molecular studies have revealed that the genus originated approximately 11.5 million years ago during the Miocene period. The genus comprises several sections, including a recently revised understanding of section Bryoria, which is now known to be polyphyletic and divided into two distinct clades. The first group (Bryoria clade 1) has been placed in an emended section Americanae, which is primarily restricted to western North America and the Himalayan region, with B. americana being the only widely distributed species in this section.

Molecular studies by Velmala et al. (2014) and Boluda et al. (2019) showed that several North American Bryoria taxa, including B. pikei (formerly identified as North American "B. capillaris"), B. pseudofuscescens, B. friabilis, and B. inactiva, belong to a single genetic clade with minimal genetic variation. While these taxa were originally distinguished by their secondary metabolites, ecology, and geographic distributions, DNA analysis did not support maintaining them as separate species. However, Bruce McCune and Daphne Stone (2022) noted that these chemical variants have distinct ecological preferences – for instance, B. friabilis is associated with inland wet forests and is common at low elevations in western Oregon and Washington, while B. pseudofuscescens dominates at higher elevations in the Cascades. To preserve this valuable ecological information while reflecting genetic reality, these taxa were reclassified as varieties of B. pseudofuscescens, distinguished by their chemical composition: var. pseudofuscescens (norstictic acid), var. friabilis (gyrophoric acid), var. inactiva (acid-deficient), and var. pikei (alectorialic acid).

Of particular interest is section Divaricatae, which molecular studies indicate is relatively young (approximately 5 million years old) and is currently undergoing active diversification. This diversification is particularly evident in South-East Asia and western North America, where new species continue to be discovered and described.

== Description ==
Bryoria species are fruticose, slender and hair-like, tending to grow hanging (pendent) or like a small bush. They range in colour from dark brown to pale greyish brown to grey in some species. Ascospores are colourless, ellipsoid, numbering eight per ascus.

The genus shows considerable morphological variation, particularly well demonstrated in species like B. tenuis. Within this species alone, five distinct growth forms have been documented: cobwebby (finely threadlike and pliant throughout), threadlike-spinulose (with short, stiff branchlets), threadlike-flexuose (with longer, more flexible branchlets), thickening-spinulose (thickened and brittle in older parts with stiff branchlets), and thickening-flexuose (thickened stems with flexible branchlets). These variations can occur within the same species, suggesting significant morphological plasticity. Main stems in Bryoria species can vary from uniformly thin throughout to distinctly thickened, particularly in basal portions. Third-order branchlets, when present, may be short and stiff or longer and more flexuous, with their arrangement varying from sparse to abundant. These morphological characteristics, while useful for identification, should be considered alongside other features as they can vary considerably within species.

Other hair-like lichens that may be confused with Bryoria include dark brown species of Bryocaulon, Nodobryoria, Pseudephebe, Alectoria, or Cetraria.

== Habitat and distribution ==
Found almost exclusively on conifers, or on tundra soil, Bryoria collectively has a widespread distribution, especially in boreal and cool temperate areas. The genus shows distinct regional diversity patterns, with particularly high species richness and ongoing diversification in South-East Asia and western North America. Some species show restricted distributions – for example, several recently described species from the Hengduan Mountains of China are known only from that region, while others like B. americana have broad circumpolar distributions. The genus appears to have undergone significant recent diversification in these areas, particularly within the last 5 million years.

== Ecology ==
Studies have shown that species in the genus Bryoria, characterized by their dark melanic pigments, show distinct ecological preferences compared to pale yellow-green usnic acid-containing hair lichens. Research on coniferous forests in British Columbia demonstrated that Bryoria species strongly favor sun-exposed, well-ventilated locations, particularly dominating south-facing slopes and upper canopy positions. This distribution pattern reflects an evolutionary specialization where melanic pigments provide crucial protection against high light exposure, allowing these lichens to thrive in dry, sun-exposed environments while shielding their photobionts from radiation damage. The melanin in their cortex effectively absorbs most incident solar radiation, enabling Bryoria species to tolerate temperatures up to 70 °C (158 °F) when desiccated. This adaptation contrasts with usnic acid-containing hair lichens, which typically prefer more shaded and humid conditions. The strong correlation between Bryoria abundance and canopy openness suggests that these lichens are particularly well-adapted to early-successional forest conditions where light exposure is high.

In British Columbia's inland temperate rainforests, Bryoria species play a pivotal role in forest food webs as the main winter forage for the endangered deep-snow mountain caribou. They tend to reach their greatest abundance in the mid to upper canopy of old-growth conifer stands, where stable branch architecture and good air circulation create favourable conditions for long, pendulous thalli. In these positions, Bryoria fremontii and B. pseudofuscescens can accumulate to "hyperabundant" levels, sometimes amounting to several tonnes of dry mass per hectare. Large portions of this biomass are shed annually as litterfall, which both refreshes lower-canopy forage and deposits fragments onto the snowpack where caribou can reach them. This process, termed the "Manna Effect" by researchers, highlights how the life history of Bryoria integrates with snowpack dynamics to provide a dependable winter food supply.

== Species ==
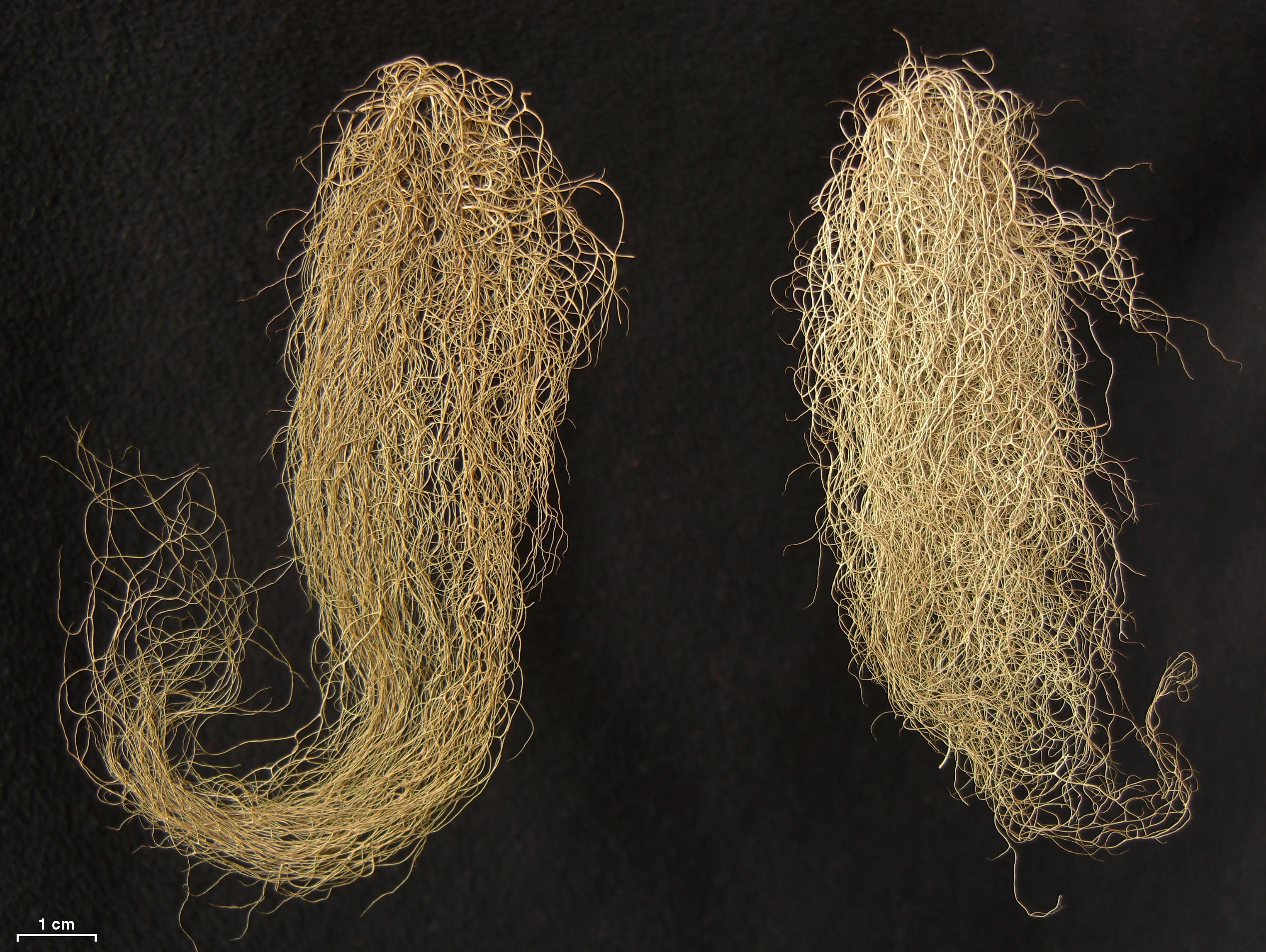
Bryoria pseudofuscescens (left) and B. capillaris (right)

- Bryoria ahtiana Myllys & Goward (2023)
- Bryoria alaskana Goward & Myllys (2016)
- Bryoria araucana Boluda, D.Hawksw. & V.J.Rico (2015) – Chile
- Bryoria barbata Li S.Wang & D.Liu (2017) – China
- Bryoria bicolor (Hoffm.) Brodo & D.Hawksw. (1977) – Electric horsehair lichen
- Bryoria capillaris (Ach.) Brodo & D.Hawksw. (1977)
- Bryoria carlottae – Languid horsehair lichen
- Bryoria cervinula – Mottled horsehair lichen
- Bryoria chalybeiformis (L.) Brodo & D.Hawksw. (1977)
- Bryoria fastigiata Li S.Wang & H.Harada (2006)
- Bryoria forsteri Olech & Bystrek (2004) – Antarctica
- Bryoria fremontii (Tuck.) Brodo & D.Hawksw. (1977) – Edible horsehair lichen
- Bryoria fruticulosa Li S.Wang & Myllys (2017) – China
- Bryoria furcellata (Fr.) Brodo & D.Hawksw. (1977) – Burred horsehair lichen
- Bryoria fuscescens (Gyeln.) Brodo & D.Hawksw. (1977) – Pale-footed horsehair lichen
- Bryoria glabra – Shiny horsehair lichen
- Bryoria hengduanensis Li S.Wang & H.Harada (2003) – China
- Bryoria implexa (Hoffm.) Brodo & D.Hawksw. (1977)
- Bryoria irwinii Goward & Myllys (2016)
- Bryoria kockiana Velmala, Myllys & Goward (2013) – Kock's horsehair lichen
- Bryoria lanestris (Ach.) Brodo & D.Hawksw. (1977)
- Bryoria nadvornikiana (Gyeln.) Brodo & D.Hawksw. (1977) – Blonde horsehair lichen
- Bryoria nitidula (Th.Fr.) Brodo & D.Hawksw. (1977) – Tundra horsehair lichen
- Bryoria pseudofuscescens (Gyeln.) Brodo & D.Hawksw. (1977) – Mountain horsehair lichen
- Bryoria rigida P.M.Jørg. & Myllys (2012) – Asia
- Bryoria salazinica – Salazinic acid horsehair lichen
- Bryoria simplicior – Spangled horsehair lichen
- Bryoria smithii (Du Rietz) Brodo & D.Hawksw. (1977)
- Bryoria subcana (Nyl. ex Stizenb.) Brodo & D.Hawksw. (1977)
- Bryoria tenuis (E.Dahl) Brodo & D.Hawksw. (1977) – Pied horsehair lichen)
- Bryoria trichodes (Michx.) Brodo & D.Hawksw. (1977) – Inelegant horsehair lichen
- Bryoria vrangiana (Gyeln.) Brodo & D.Hawksw. (1977)
- Bryoria wui Li S.Wang (2017) – China
- Bryoria yunnanensis Li S.Wang & Xin Y.Wang (2017) – China
