= Succinprotocetraric acid =

Names
- IUPAC name Succinprotocetraric acid
- Systematic IUPAC name 4-(3-carboxypropanoyloxymethyl)-10-formyl-3,9-dihydroxy-1,7-dimethyl-6-oxobenzo[b][1,4]benzodioxepine-2-carboxylic acid

Identifiers
3D model (JSmol)	Interactive image
ChEBI	CHEBI:144306
PubChem CID	102239721
- InChI: InChI=1S/C22H18O12/c1-8-5-12(24)10(6-23)19-15(8)22(31)34-20-11(7-32-14(27)4-3-13(25)26)17(28)16(21(29)30)9(2)18(20)33-19/h5-6,24,28H,3-4,7H2,1-2H3,(H,25,26)(H,29,30) Key: ROISWLBRDLJEFL-UHFFFAOYSA-N
- SMILES: CC1=CC(=C(C2=C1C(=O)OC3=C(O2)C(=C(C(=C3COC(=O)CCC(=O)O)O)C(=O)O)C)C=O)O

Properties
Chemical formula	C_{22}H_{18}O_{12}
Molar mass	474.374 g·mol^{−1}
- Except where otherwise noted, data are given for materials in their standard state (at 25 °C [77 °F], 100 kPa). Infobox references

Succinprotocetraric acid is an organic chemical compound with the formula C_{22}H_{18}O_{12}. It is the ester of succinic acid and protocetraric acid and it is classified as a depsidone.

Succinprotocetraric acid is produced by certain lichens.

== Known sources ==
- Buellia capensis
- Chondropsis semiviridis
- Menegazzia petraea
- Parmelia reptans
- Cladonia metacorallifera
- Cladonia rangiferina
- Cladonia arbuscula
- Cetraria islandica, though only of a specific chemotype
