= Irwin M. Brodo =

American-born Canadian lichenologist and botanist

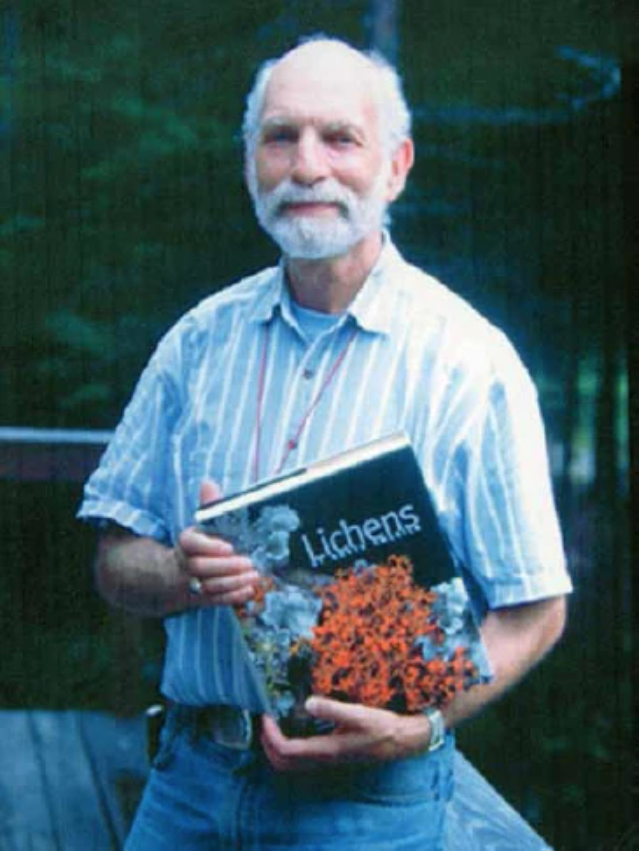
- Brodo in Maine on 2 September 2001, receiving the first copy of Lichens of North America
- Born: 7 November 1935 (age 90)
- Education: City College; Cornell University; Michigan State University
- Scientific career
- Fields: Lichenology
- Workplaces: Canadian Museum of Nature
- Author abbrev. (botany): Brodo

Irwin Murray Brodo (born November 7, 1935 in New York City) is an emeritus scientist at the Canadian Museum of Nature, in Ottawa, Ontario, Canada. He is an authority on the identification and biology of lichens.

== Early life and education ==
Brodo grew up in the Bronx and attended City College in Manhattan as an undergraduate. He went on to do his graduate studies at Columbia University, and received a master's degree from Cornell University. He earned a Ph.D. in lichenology under the supervision of Henry Imshaug at Michigan State University.

== Career and research ==
In 1965, Brodo was hired by the National Museum of Canada (now the Canadian Museum of Nature), where he continues to work as a research scientist emeritus. Over his career, he has built the lichen collection (CANL) into one of the best in North America. His research includes in-depth studies on challenging genera such as Bryoria, Lecanora, and Ochrolechia. His 1968 work on the lichens of Long Island and the effects of air pollutants was pioneering in the field.

In 1970, Brodo started to edit the exsiccata series Lichenes Canadenses exsiccati.

== Selected publications ==
Brodo's list of publications includes approximately 100 scientific articles, 8 popular articles, 22 reviews and 6 editorials and obituaries. One of his great achievements was the publication in 2001 of the 795 page book, Lichens of North America with high-quality photographs of lichens taken by Sylvia Sharnoff and Stephen Sharnoff. It won the 2002 National Outdoor Book Award (Nature Guidebook). In 2016, he produced Keys to Lichens of North America: Revised and Expanded, a spiral-bound workbook of over 400 pages including keys to 2045 species.

== Teaching and mentorship ==
Brodo has taught at Université Laval and the University of Alaska, and he also supervised master's students at the University of Ottawa and Carleton University. He has also given numerous introductory workshops, including a popular field-course on crustose lichens at the Eagle Hill Institute in coastal Maine.

== Professional Leadership ==
Brodo has held several leadership positions in professional organizations. He served as President of the International Association for Lichenology for a four-year term and President of the American Bryological and Lichenological Society for a two-year term.

He has also been involved in public service, including work with the Ottawa Field-Naturalists' Club and the Ottawa-Hull chapter of the Canadian Parks and Wilderness Society.

== Honors and awards ==
Brodo has received numerous honors throughout his career. In 1994, he was honored with an Acharius Medal presented to him by the International Association for Lichenology. In 1993, Brodo was awarded the Mary E. Elliot Service Award for his meritorious service to the Canadian Botanical Association — and in 2003, for lifetime achievement, the association's George Lawson Medal. In 2013, Brodo was presented with an honorary doctorate from Carleton University, "in recognition of his distinguished career in lichenology and scientific leadership in the international biosystematics community".

== Eponyms ==
A lichen genus and several lichen taxa have been named to honor Brodo. These eponyms include:

- Brodoa Goward (1987); Bactrospora brodoi Egea & Torrente (1993) Lecanora brodoana Lumbsch & T.Nash (1995); Megalaria brodoana S.Ekman & Tønsberg (1996); Bryoria trichodes subsp. brodoana Bystr. & Fabiszewski (1998); Lecidea brodoana Hertel & Leuckert (2004); Ochrolechia brodoi Kukwa (2011); Lepraria brodoi Lendemer & Tønsberg (2014); Rinodina brodoana Sheard, Lendemer & E.A.Tripp (2014); Acarospora brodoana K.Knudsen, Kocourk. & M.Westb. (2016); Alectoria brodoana Essl. (2016); Bryoria irwinii Goward & Myllys (2016); and Catinaria brodoana R.C.Harris & W.R.Buck (2016).

== See also ==
- Category:Taxa named by Irwin Brodo
