= Fumarprotocetraric acid =

Names
- IUPAC name 4-[[(E)-3-Carboxyprop-2-enoyl]oxymethyl]-10-formyl-3,9-dihydroxy-1,7-dimethyl-6-oxobenzo[b][1,4]benzodioxepine-2-carboxylic acid
- Other names Fumaroprotocetraric acid

Identifiers
CAS Number	489-50-9
3D model (JSmol)	Interactive image
ChEBI	CHEBI:144157
ChEMBL	ChEMBL366861
ChemSpider	4476288
ECHA InfoCard	100.006.999
EC Number	207-698-8
PubChem CID	5317419
UNII	5VJ6J3A960
CompTox Dashboard (EPA)	DTXSID801313939
- InChI: InChI=1S/C22H16O12/c1-8-5-12(24)10(6-23)19-15(8)22(31)34-20-11(7-32-14(27)4-3-13(25)26)17(28)16(21(29)30)9(2)18(20)33-19/h3-6,24,28H,7H2,1-2H3,(H,25,26)(H,29,30)/b4-3+ Key: VEGGRTFDFMUBPD-ONEGZZNKSA-N
- SMILES: CC1=CC(=C(C2=C1C(=O)OC3=C(O2)C(=C(C(=C3COC(=O)/C=C/C(=O)O)O)C(=O)O)C)C=O)O

Properties
Chemical formula	C_{22}H_{16}O_{12}
Molar mass	472.358 g·mol^{−1}
Appearance	Colorless, odorless solid with bitter taste
- Except where otherwise noted, data are given for materials in their standard state (at 25 °C [77 °F], 100 kPa). Infobox references

Fumarprotocetraric acid is a chemical compound with the chemical formula C_{22}H_{16}O_{12}. It is a secondary metabolite produced by a variety of lichens.

== Occurrence ==
Fumarprotocetraric acid is mainly known for its occurrence in Iceland moss (Cetraria islandica), where it is present in a mass fraction of 1–2% (dried thallus).

In addition, fumarprotocetraric acid has been detected in many other lichens, including:

- Callopisma teicholytum [Ach.]
- Cetraria fahluensis [L.]
- Cetraria islandica [L.]
- Cladina rangiferina [L.]
- Cladina silvatica [L.]
- Cladonia chlorophaea [Flörke]
- Cladonia fimbriata [L.] var. apolepta [Ach.] f. coniocraea [Flörke]
- Cladonia fimbriata [L.] var. cornuto-radiata [Coem.]
- Cladonia fimbriata [L.] var. simplex [Weis] f. major [Hag.]
- Cladonia fimbriata [L.] var. simplex [Weis] f. minor [Hag.]
- Cladonia foliacea [Huds.] var. alcicornis [Lightf.]
- Cladonia foliacea [Huds.] var. convoluta [Lam.]
- Cladonia furcata [Huds.] var. pinnata [Flörke]
- Cladonia furcata [Huds.] var. racemosa [Hoffm.]
- Cladonia gracilis [L.] var. chordalis [Flörke]
- Cladonia gracilis [L.] var. elongata [Jacq.]
- Cladonia pityrea [Flörke] var. cladomorpha [Flörke]
- Cladonia pityrea [Flörke] var. Zwackhii [Wainio]
- Cladonia pyxidata [L.] var. cereina [Arnold]
- Cladonia pyxidata [L.] var. neglecta [Flörke]
- Cladonia subcervicornis [Wainio]
- Cladonia verticillata [Hoffm.] var. cervicornis [Ach.] f. phyllophora [(Flörke) Sandstede]
- Cladonia verticillata [Hoffm.] var. evoluta [Wainio]
- Dendrographa leucophaea [Tuck.]
- Parmelia stygia [(L.) Ach.]

== Pharmacology research ==
Fumarprotocetraric acid has antibacterial activity. It also induces an immunostimulating effect in vitro by triggering the formation of hydrogen peroxide. Furthermore, cytotoxicity against two cancer cell lines has been demonstrated.
