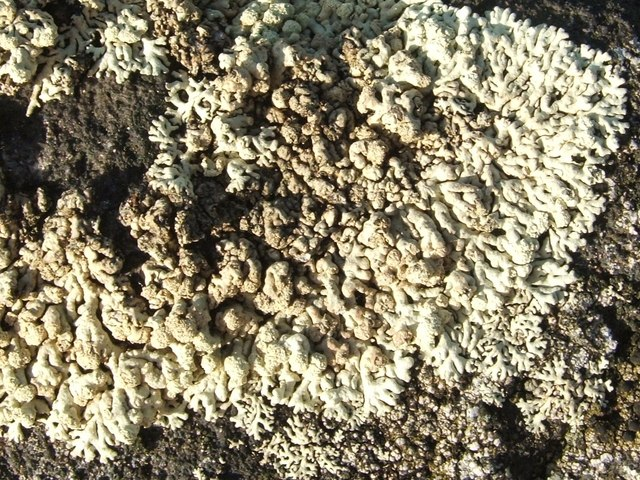

Conservation status
- Secure (NatureServe)

Scientific classification
- Kingdom: Fungi
- Division: Ascomycota
- Class: Lecanoromycetes
- Order: Lecanorales
- Family: Parmeliaceae
- Genus: Arctoparmelia
- Species: A. incurva

Binomial name
- Arctoparmelia incurva (Pers.) Hale (1986)

Synonyms
- List: Lichen incurvus Pers. (1794); Lobaria incurva (Pers.) Ach. (1803); Imbricaria incurva (Pers.) DC. (1805); Placodium incurvum (Pers.) Frege (1812); Parmelia incurva (Pers.) Fr. (1826); Parmelia centrifuga f. incurva (Pers.) Schaer. (1840); Xanthoparmelia incurva (Pers.) Hale (1974); Lichen multifidus Dicks. (1793); Parmelia centrifuga var. multifida Schaer. (1840); Parmelia multifida Schaer. (1842); Parmelia multifida A.L.Sm. (1918)

= Arctoparmelia incurva =

Species of lichen

Arctoparmelia incurva is a species of saxicolous (rock-dwelling), foliose lichen in the family Parmeliaceae. First described in 1794 by Christiaan Hendrik Persoon, it has undergone several taxonomic reclassifications before being placed in its current genus in 1986. This yellowish-green lichen, characterised by its narrow, convex lobes and globular soralia, typically grows on sun-exposed siliceous rocks in alpine and arctic habitats. It has a circumpolar distribution, found across North America, Europe, and parts of Asia. A. incurva can be distinguished from similar species by its specific morphological features and chemical spot test reactions. The lichen is known to host several parasitic fungi and has shown tolerance to acid pollution.

== Taxonomy ==
It was first scientifically described as a new species in 1794 by Christiaan Hendrik Persoon. He classified it in the genus Lichen, as was the custom thanks to the influence of Carl Linnaeus. Following proposed transfers to various genera, including Lobaria, and the now-obsolete Imbricaria and Placodium, the taxon got transferred to Parmelia by Elias Magnus Fries in 1826. It remained in that genus for more than a century, when Mason Hale reclassified it in the large genus Xanthoparmelia in 1974. A dozen years later, he transferred it to Arctoparmelia.

Common names used to refer to this lichen include "powdered rockfrog", "fist lichen", and "sorediate ring lichen".

== Description ==
Arctoparmelia incurva is a lichen with a yellowish-green thallus measuring between 0.5 and 2 cm (3/16 and 13/16 in) in diameter, often merging with others to form much larger thalli, sometimes up to 20 cm (8 in) wide. The thallus is very closely attached to the substrate, with the inner parts frequently showing signs of degeneration. The lobes comprising the thallus are narrow, up to 3 or occasionally 4 mm wide, radiating outwards in an intricate pattern without overlapping and are convex.

The upper surface of the thallus is a dull yellow-grey, becoming darker towards the centre. Soralia, which are structures that produce soredia (reproductive granules), measure 2 to 4 mm in diameter and are found at the ends of smaller, inner lobes within the thallus. These soralia are globular and scattered. The lower surface is pale and finely pubescent (covered with soft, fine hairs). Rhizines, which are root-like structures that anchor the lichen to its substrate, are sparse, dark, short, and lack septa (dividing walls).

Apothecia, the fruiting bodies of the lichen, are rare and have a brown disc. The medulla (the inner layer) and soralia are C− and K−, but are KC+ (red). They react to para-phenylenediamine either Pd+ (rust-red) or Pd−. Under ultraviolet light, they show a vivid glaucous blue fluorescence, indicating the presence of alectoronic acid, and sometimes also α-collatolic and/or protocetraric acids. The cortex (the outer layer) reacts K+ (yellow) and KC+ (yellow) due to the presence of usnic acid. There is significant variation in the content of protocetraric acid among populations of Arctoparmelia incurva; in some populations, it is absent, while in others, it is predominant.

== Similar species ==
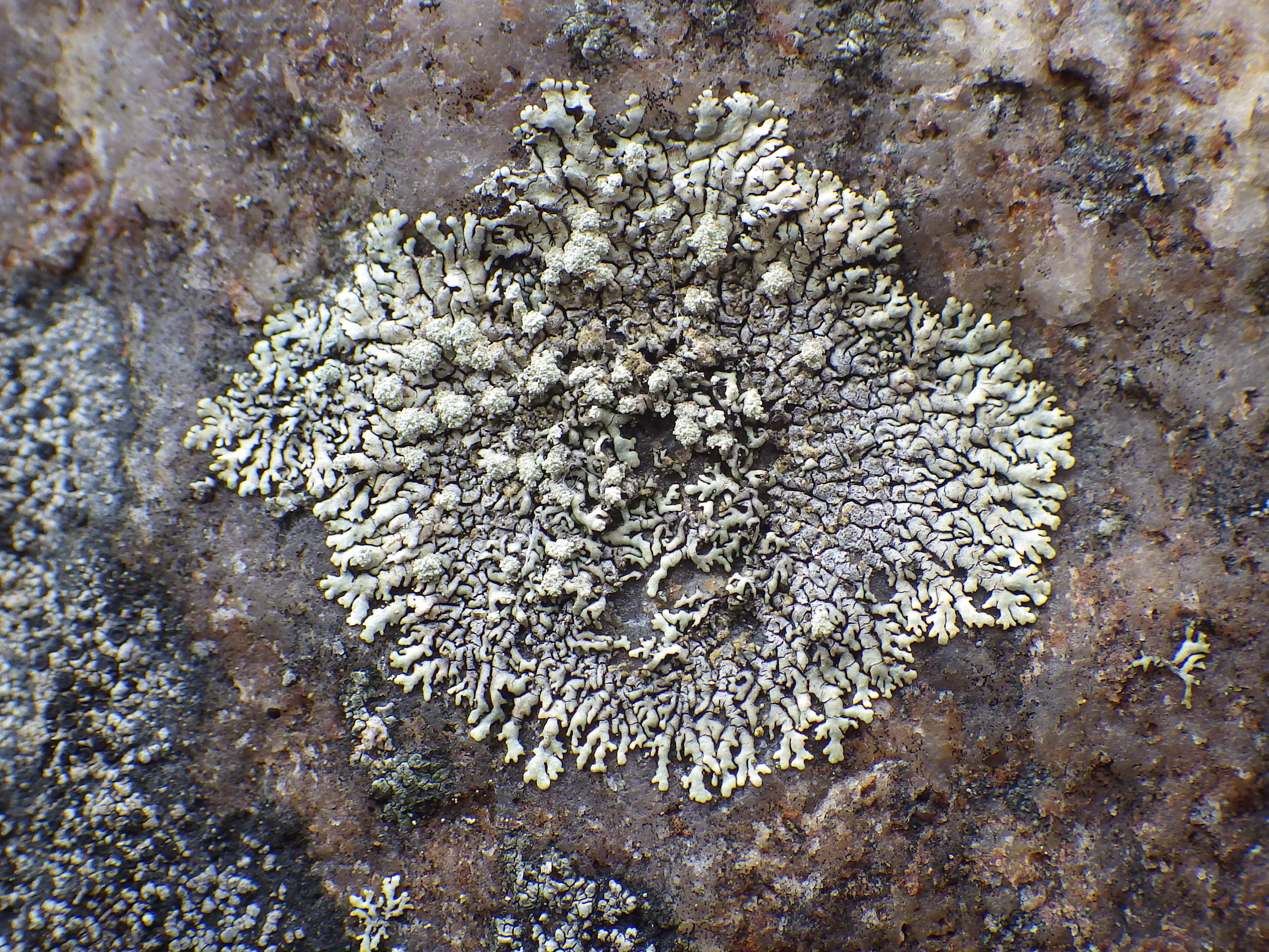
Xanthoparmelia mougeotii

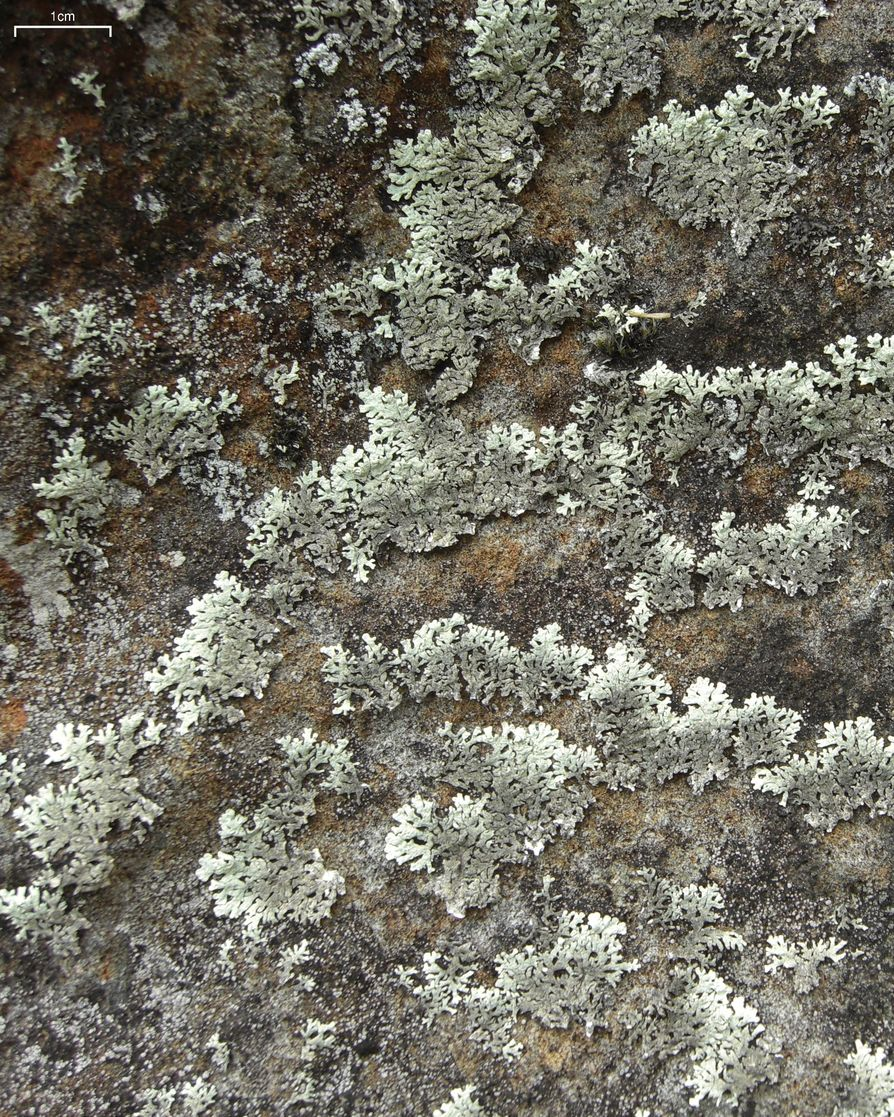
Arctoparmelia centrifuga

While sharing several morphological characteristics with Arctoparmelia incurva, Arctoparmelia centrifuga can be distinguished by its lack of soredia and the presence of apothecia. Another member of the genus, Arctoparmelia subcentrifuga, also produces soredia but differs in that its soredia are diffuse rather than discrete on the upper thallus surface.

Arctoparmelia incurva bears a superficial resemblance to Xanthoparmelia mougeotii. Nonetheless, several key features set X. mougeotii apart: its lobes exhibit less curvature, and it possesses round, flattened soralia on its surface. Furthermore, the medulla of X. mougeotii displays a distinctive colour change from yellow to red when exposed to potassium hydroxide solution (K), yet shows no reaction to ultraviolet light (UV). Additionally, X. mougeotii is characterised by a glossy, even outer layer.

== Habitat and distribution ==
Arctoparmelia incurva grows on sun-exposed siliceous rocks, and very rarely on wood. It is tolerant of acid pollution. It is widely distributed in Europe, where it has been recorded from 19 countries. In North America its range is mainly arctic, with records documented as far south as southern British Columbia and the Cascade Range. Researchers have also reported it in the Appalachians and the Great Lakes region. Arctoparmelia incurva has also been recorded in Greenland, Japan, Russia, and Ukraine.

== Species interactions ==
Lichenoconium erodens is a lichenicolous fungus species that is known to parasitise Arctoparmelia incurva. It is also a known host of Arthrorhaphis arctoparmeliae, Trimmatostroma arctoparmeliae, and Intralichen lichenicola.
