= Arctoparmelia separata =

Conservation status
- Secure (NatureServe)

Scientific classification
- Domain: Eukaryota
- Kingdom: Fungi
- Division: Ascomycota
- Class: Lecanoromycetes
- Order: Lecanorales
- Family: Parmeliaceae
- Genus: Arctoparmelia
- Species: A. separata

Binomial name
- Arctoparmelia separata (Th.Fr.) Hale (1974)

Synonyms
- Parmelia separata Th.Fr. (1879); Xanthoparmelia separata (Th.Fr.) Hale (1974)

Species of lichen

Arctoparmelia separata, commonly known as the rippled ring lichen, is a species of foliose, ring lichen in the family Parmeliaceae with a roughly circumpolar distribution.

== Taxonomy ==
The lichen was first described scientifically by Theodor Magnus Fries in 1879 as a species of Parmelia. Mason Hale transferred it to Xanthoparmelia in 1974. In 1986, Hale segregated five Xanthoparmelia species to the newly created genus Arctoparmelia in 1986. This group of species, including X. separata, is characterized by the velvety, ivory-white to purplish colour of the lower surface of the thallus, the presence of alectoronic acid, and a geographical range restricted to arctic or boreal locations. Arctoparmelia separata is commonly known as the rippled ring lichen.

== Description ==
Arctoparmelia separata resembles the more common Arctoparmelia centrifuga, but is distinguished from that species by the dull mouse-grey colour of its lower surface, and its thicker and more rigid thallus, and its long lobes that are divaricately branched. The lichen has an incompletely circumpolar distribution. It has been recorded from northern North America, Greenland, and Japan, and Siberia west to Novaya Zemlya. It has not been recorded in continental Europe.
