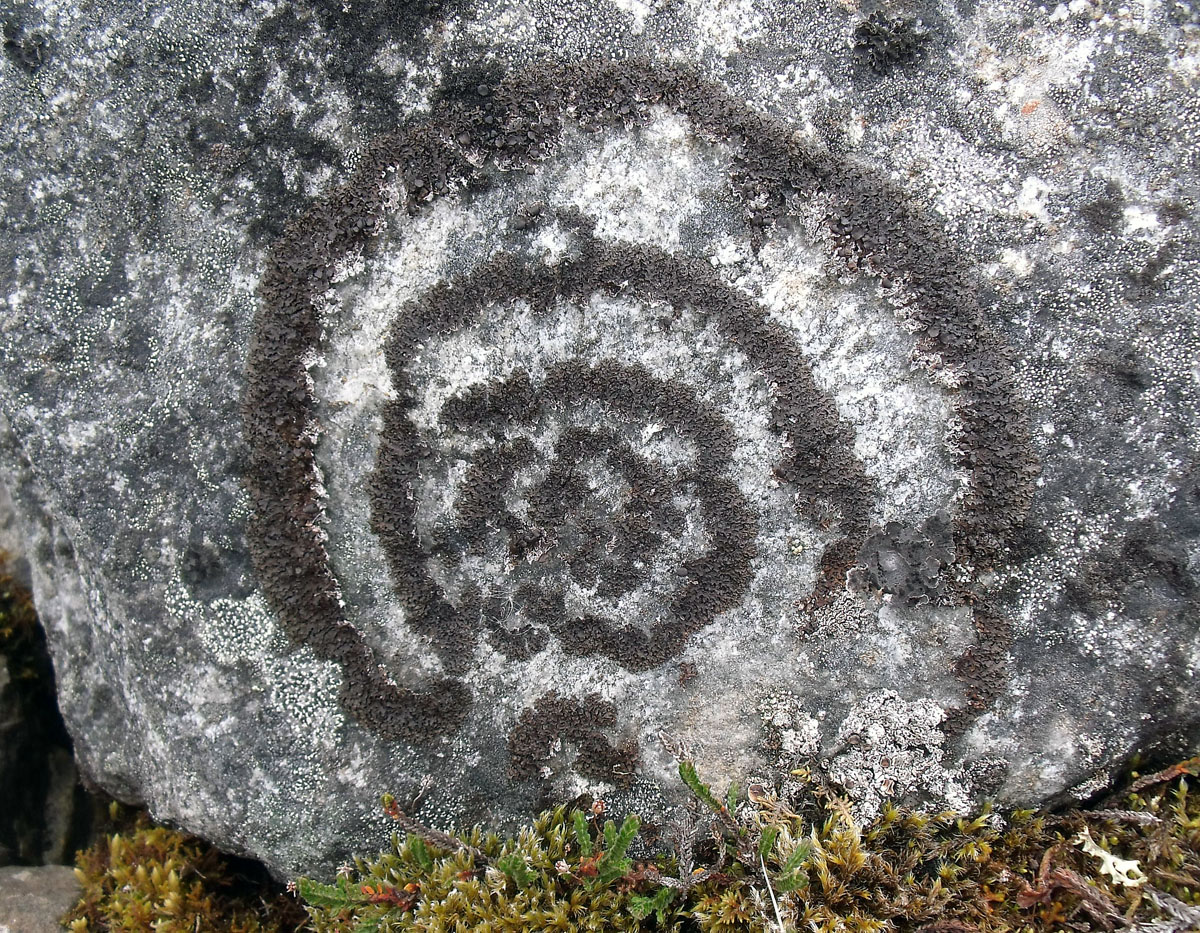
- Arctoparmelia centrifuga

Scientific classification
- Domain: Eukaryota
- Kingdom: Fungi
- Division: Ascomycota
- Class: Lecanoromycetes
- Order: Lecanorales
- Family: Parmeliaceae
- Genus: Arctoparmelia; Hale (1986)

Type species
- Arctoparmelia centrifuga (L.) Hale (1986)

Species
- A. centrifuga A. collatolica A. incurva A. separata A. subcentrifuga

= Arctoparmelia =

Genus of lichen

Arctoparmelia is a genus of foliose lichens in the family Parmeliaceae. Established in 1986, the genus comprises five species of rock-dwelling lichens found primarily in arctic and boreal regions of the Northern Hemisphere. These lichens are characterized by their distinctive velvety or ivory-white to pale brown lower surfaces, concentric growth patterns, and unique chemistry, including the presence of alectoronic acid and negative reactions to iodine-based tests. Arctoparmelia species, commonly known as ring lichens, vary in size from small thalli to specimens up to 1 m (3 ft 3 in) in diameter, and typically grow on exposed rocks in cold, dry environments. While most species show broad circumpolar distributions, some are restricted to specific regions.

== Taxonomy ==
The genus was circumscribed by American lichenologist Mason Hale in 1986 with A. centrifuga (formerly in Xanthoparmelia) as the type species. The genus was created to accommodate a distinct group of species previously classified within Xanthoparmelia, specifically the X. centrifuga group. This taxonomic revision was based on several key morphological, chemical, and biogeographical characteristics that set these species apart from other members of Xanthoparmelia. Despite some morphological similarities with Xanthoparmelia species, molecular studies have shown that Arctoparmelia is more closely related to hypogymnioid lichens, belonging to the same clade as the genera Brodoa, Hypogymnia, and Pseudevernia.

The type species of the genus, Arctoparmelia centrifuga, was first described by Carl Linnaeus in 1753 as Lichen centrifugus. This species has undergone several taxonomic revisions throughout history, being transferred through various genera including Parmelia (1803) and Xanthoparmelia (1974) before finally being designated as the type species of Arctoparmelia. Hale's original circumscription included five species, with A. aleuritica as a distinct taxon. However, A. aleuritica was later determined to be an usnic acid-deficient chemotype of A. centrifuga and was formally synonymized by Stephen Clayden in 1992, a treatment followed by subsequent researchers, such as in the "Parmeliaceae" volume of the Nordic Lichen Flora. The Siberian species A. collatolica was added to the genus in 2019.

The genus name Arctoparmelia reflects the predominantly arctic distribution of its members, combining "arcto-" (referring to arctic regions) with "parmelia", a common genus name in the Parmeliaceae derived from the Greek words for "small shield", referring to the shape of the lichen's reproductive structures. Arctoparmelia species are commonly known as "ring lichens" due to their characteristic appearance.

== Description ==
Arctoparmelia is characterized by its distinctive velvety or ivory-white to pale brown lower surface, which differs markedly from its relatives. Individual species vary considerably in size, with A. centrifuga forming the largest thalli up to 1 m (3 ft 3 in) in diameter, while A. collatolica reaches up to 30 cm (12 in) across. Species differ in their growth patterns, particularly in how they maintain their central portions. A. collatolica notably retains its central thallus area for extended periods, with concentric circles growing tightly together when the centre eventually deteriorates. This contrasts with A. centrifuga, where the central portion breaks down more quickly, leaving distinctive gaps between concentric growth rings. The upper surface (cortex) of Arctoparmelia species has a unique layered structure: the outermost layer is covered with a protective coating (epicorticate), while underneath, the surface often appears obscured by a frost-like coating (pruina). When examined under a scanning electron microscope, the velvety texture of the lower surface reveals itself to be composed of regular, knobby projections of fungal cells. In usnic acid-deficient forms of A. centrifuga, the upper surface appears grey rather than the typical yellowish-green, though both forms produce atranorin in the cortex. These chemotypes can occur side by side, and studies have shown no detectable differences between them in morphology, reproductive state, or associated fungi. The usnic acid-deficient forms maintain normal reproductive capacity, commonly bearing both pycnidia and apothecia with viable spores.

The internal structure (medulla) of Arctoparmelia contains several distinctive secondary metabolites. Most species produce alectoronic acid and α-collatolic acid, along with significant amounts of atranorin. One of the genus's defining characteristics is its negative reaction to iodine-based chemical tests, which helps distinguish it from the closely related genus Xanthoparmelia.

Root-like structures (rhizines) that typically anchor lichens to their substrate are sparsely developed or sometimes absent in Arctoparmelia species. The reproductive structures (apothecia) are attached directly to the lichen's surface, lack a stem (adnate), and have holes in their spore-producing layer (imperforate). The species show distinct ecological preferences in their growth habits, with A. collatolica demonstrating a strong preference for shaded conditions, while other species in the genus can grow in both shaded and sun-exposed locations.

== Habitat and distribution ==
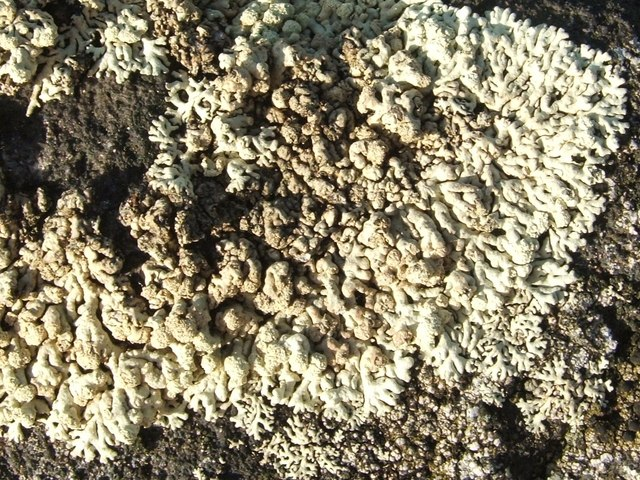
Arctoparmelia incurva

Arctoparmelia lichens are primarily saxicolous (rock-dwelling) organisms found in dry temperate and arctic regions of the Northern Hemisphere. The genus has adapted specifically to grow on exposed rock surfaces, particularly in areas with cold or subarctic climates. Individual species show distinct distribution patterns: Arctoparmelia centrifuga is one of the most abundant species within the genus, being particularly common across Arctic regions with extensive documentation throughout North America's Arctic territories. A. incurva shares this circumpolar distribution pattern. A. separata also displays a broad circumpolar distribution, occurring across Arctic Canada and extending into Alaska, Japan, and across Siberia as far west as Novaya Zemlya, though notably absent from European territories.

Other species show more limited ranges: A. subcentrifuga has a sporadic distribution, with documented occurrences in Greenland, Baffin Island, and along the northern shores of Lake Superior in Canada, as well as the Rocky Mountains, southwestern Siberia, and Nepal, though records in the United States are limited.

Within A. centrifuga, the usnic acid-deficient chemotype shows a unique disjunct distribution pattern. It is relatively common in Fennoscandia, documented from approximately 100 localities across Norway, Sweden, and Finland. In North America, this chemotype is much rarer, with early records limited to isolated populations in New Brunswick and Newfoundland, separated by over 800 km (500 mi) – an unusual biogeographic pattern not seen in other lichens or plants of the region. Studies suggest that this chemotype has likely arisen independently multiple times rather than spreading from a single origin.

The genus as a whole demonstrates a clear preference for cold-climate environments, with most species showing adaptations to arctic and subarctic conditions. These lichens typically colonise exposed rock surfaces in relatively dry areas, suggesting they have evolved to tolerate both cold temperatures and periods of limited moisture availability. Their success in these harsh environments has led to them becoming significant components of arctic and boreal rock surface communities.

== Species ==
- Arctoparmelia centrifuga (L.) Hale (1986) – concentric ring lichen
- Arctoparmelia collatolica Chesnokov & Prokopiev (2019)
- Arctoparmelia incurva (Pers.) Hale (1986) – finger ring lichen
- Arctoparmelia separata (Th.Fr.) Hale (1986) – rippled ring lichen
- Arctoparmelia subcentrifuga (Oxner) Hale (1986) – abrading ring lichen

Arctoparmelia aleuritica (Nyl.) Hale (1986) was synonymized with A. centrifuga.
