= Ethnolichenology =

Study of the relationship between lichens and humans

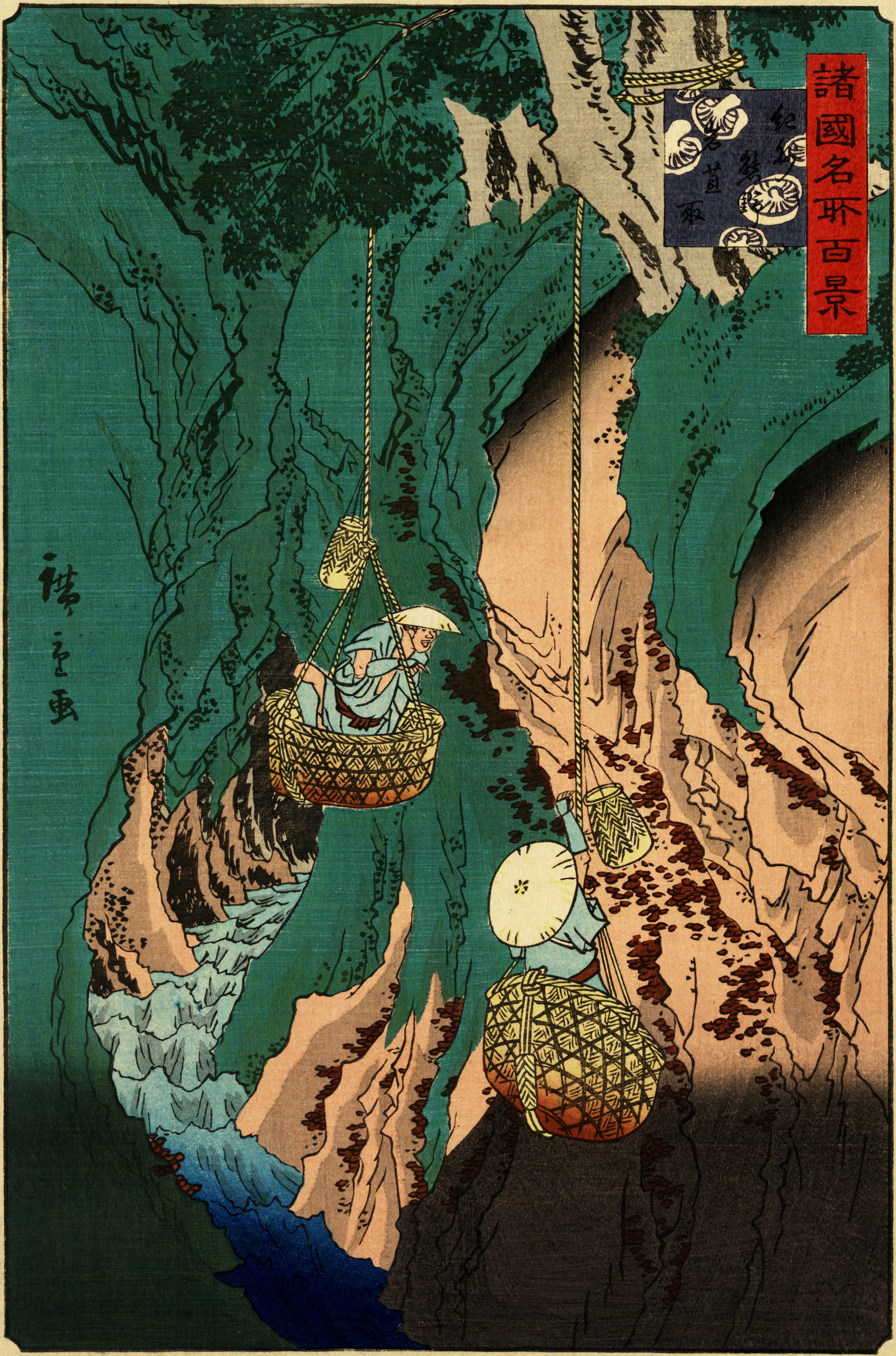
Iwatake (Umbilicaria esculenta) gathering at Kumano in Kishū, by Hiroshige II

Ethnolichenology is the study of the relationship between lichens and people. Lichens have and are being used for many different purposes by human cultures across the world. The most common human use of lichens is for dye, but they have also been used for medicine, food and other purposes.

== Lichens for dye ==
Lichens are a common source of natural dyes. The lichen dye is usually extracted by either boiling water or ammonia fermentation. Although usually called ammonia fermentation, this method is not actually a fermentation and involves letting the lichen steep in ammonia (traditionally urine) for at least two to three weeks.

In North America the most significant lichen dye is Letharia vulpina. Indigenous people through most of this lichen's range in North America traditionally make a yellow dye from this lichen by boiling it in water.

Many of the traditional dyes of the Scottish Highlands were made from lichens including red dyes from the cudbear lichen, Lecanora tartarea, the common orange lichen, Xanthoria parietina, and several species of leafy Parmelia lichens. Brown or yellow lichen dyes (called crottle or crotal), made from Parmelia saxatilis scraped off rocks, and red lichen dyes (called corkir) were used extensively to produce tartans.

Purple dyes from lichens were historically very important throughout Europe from the 15th to 17th centuries. They were generally extracted from Roccella spp. lichens imported from the Canary Islands, Cape Verde Islands, Madagascar, or India. These lichens, and the dye extracted from them, are called orchil (variants archil, orchilla). The same dye was also produced from Ochrolechia spp. lichens in Britain and was called cudbear. Both Roccella spp. and Ochrolechia spp. contain the lichen substance orcin, which converts into the purple dye orcein in the ammonia fermentation process.

Litmus, a water-soluble pH indicator dye mixture, is extracted from Roccella species.

== Lichens for medicine ==
Many lichens have been used medicinally across the world. A lichen's usefulness as a medicine is often related to the lichen secondary compounds that are abundant in most lichen thalli. Different lichens produce a wide variety of these compounds, most of which are unique to lichens and many of which are antibiotic. It has been estimated that 50% of all lichen species have antibiotic properties. Many lichen extracts have been found to be effective in killing Gram-positive bacteria, which included species that cause boils, scarlet fever, and pneumonia

One of the most potent lichen antibiotics is usnic acid, as a result Usnea spp. are commonly used in traditional medicines. Usnea was used in the United States as a fungal remedy of the mouth, stomach, intestines, anus, vagina, nose, ear, and skin, and in Finland it was used to treat wounds, skin eruptions, and athlete's foot. In Russia a preparation of the sodium salt of usnic acid was sold under the name Binan for the treatment of varicose and trophic ulcers, second and third degree burns, and for plastic surgery.

Other lichens commonly featured in folk medicines include Iceland moss and Lungwort.

== Lichens for poisons ==
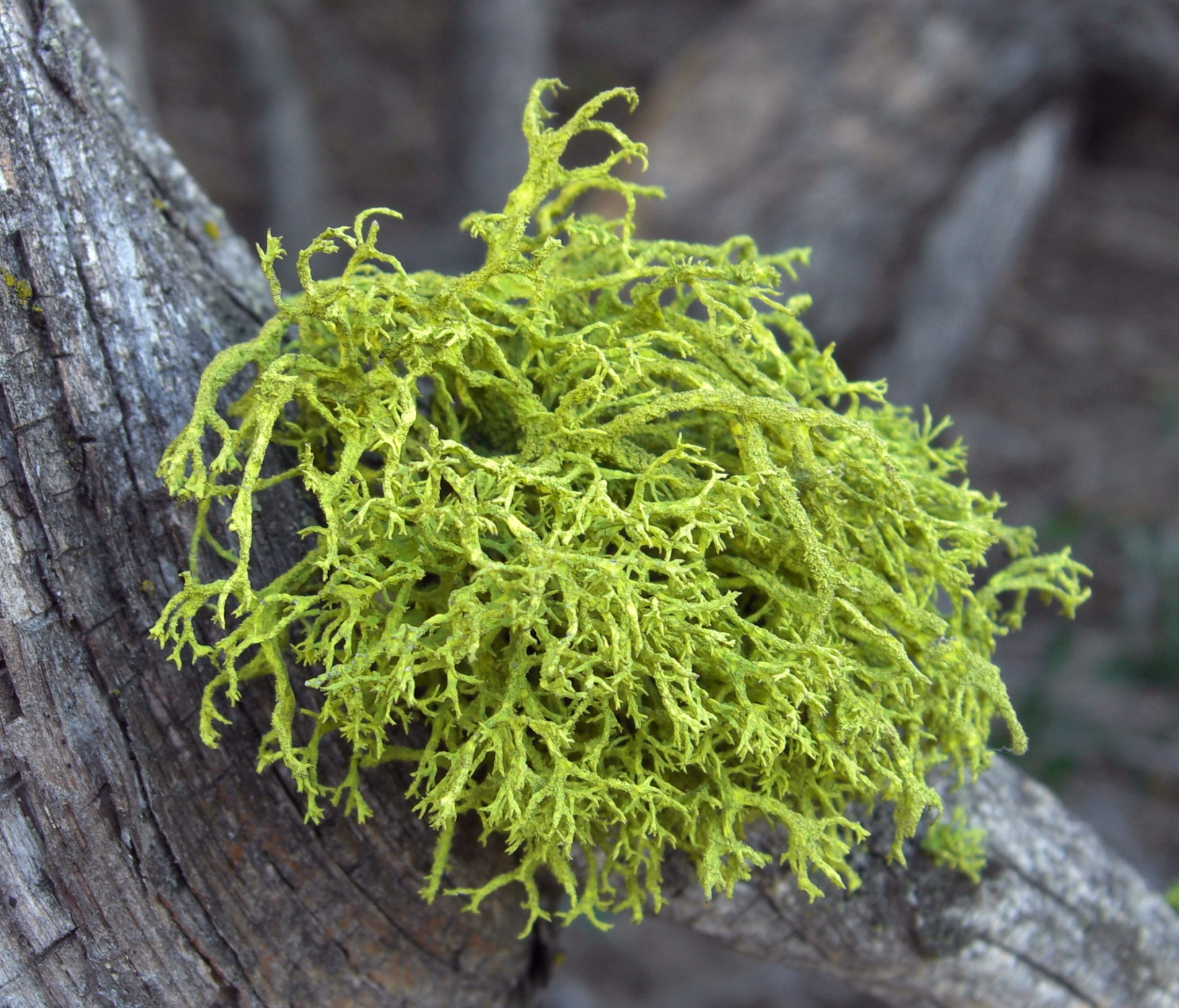
Letharia vulpina, the wolf lichen

Only a few lichens are truly poisonous, with species of Letharia and Vulpicida being the primary examples. These lichens are yellow because they have high concentrations of the bright yellow toxin vulpinic acid.

Wolf lichen (Letharia vulpina) was used in Scandinavia to poison wolves. The process begins by adding the lichens to various baits such as reindeer blood and other meats, while sometimes mixing the concoction with ground glass or strychnine. Wolves that ate the concoction were reported to succumb in less than 24 hours. The Achomawi people of northern California use Letharia to poison arrowheads. The arrowheads would be soaked in the lichens for a year sometimes with the addition of rattlesnake venom. Although toxic, wolf lichens were used to treat sores and inflammation by indigenous people in north California and southern British Columbia, and even taken internally as medicine.

== Lichens for food ==
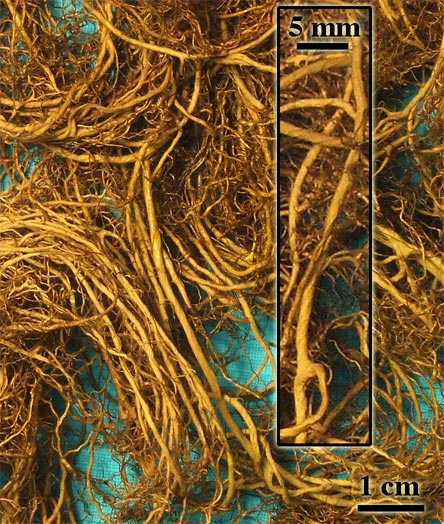
The hairlike lichen Bryoria fremontii is edible.

There are records of lichens being used as food by many different human cultures across the world. Lichens are eaten by people in North America, Europe, Asia, and Africa, and perhaps elsewhere. Often lichens are merely famine foods eaten in times of dire needs, but in some cultures lichens are a staple food or even a delicacy. They are also a source of vitamin D.

In the past Iceland moss (Cetraria islandica) was an important human food in northern Europe and Scandinavia, and was cooked in many different ways, such as bread, porridge, pudding, soup, or salad. Bryoria fremontii was an important food in parts of North America, where it was usually pitcooked. It is even featured in a Secwepemc story. Reindeer lichen (Cladonia spp.) is a staple food of reindeer and caribou in the Arctic. Northern peoples in North America and Siberia traditionally eat the partially digested lichen after they remove it from the rumen of caribou that have been killed. It is often called 'stomach icecream'. Rock tripe (Umbilicaria spp. and Lasalia spp.) is a lichen that has frequently been used as an emergency food in North America. One species of Umbilicaria, Iwa-take (U. esculenta), is used in a variety of traditional Korean and Japanese foods. It is quite expensive, and is collected off the sides of cliffs. In India, Parmotrema perlatum lichen is a popular ingredient of many spice mixes, such as garam masala, kaala masala and goda masala, bhojwar masala from Hyderabad and potli masala of Uttar Pradesh.

Very few lichens are poisonous. Poisonous lichens include those high in vulpinic acid or usnic acid. Most (but not all) lichens that contain vulpinic acid are yellow, so any yellow lichen should be considered to be potentially poisonous.

== Lichens for embalming ==
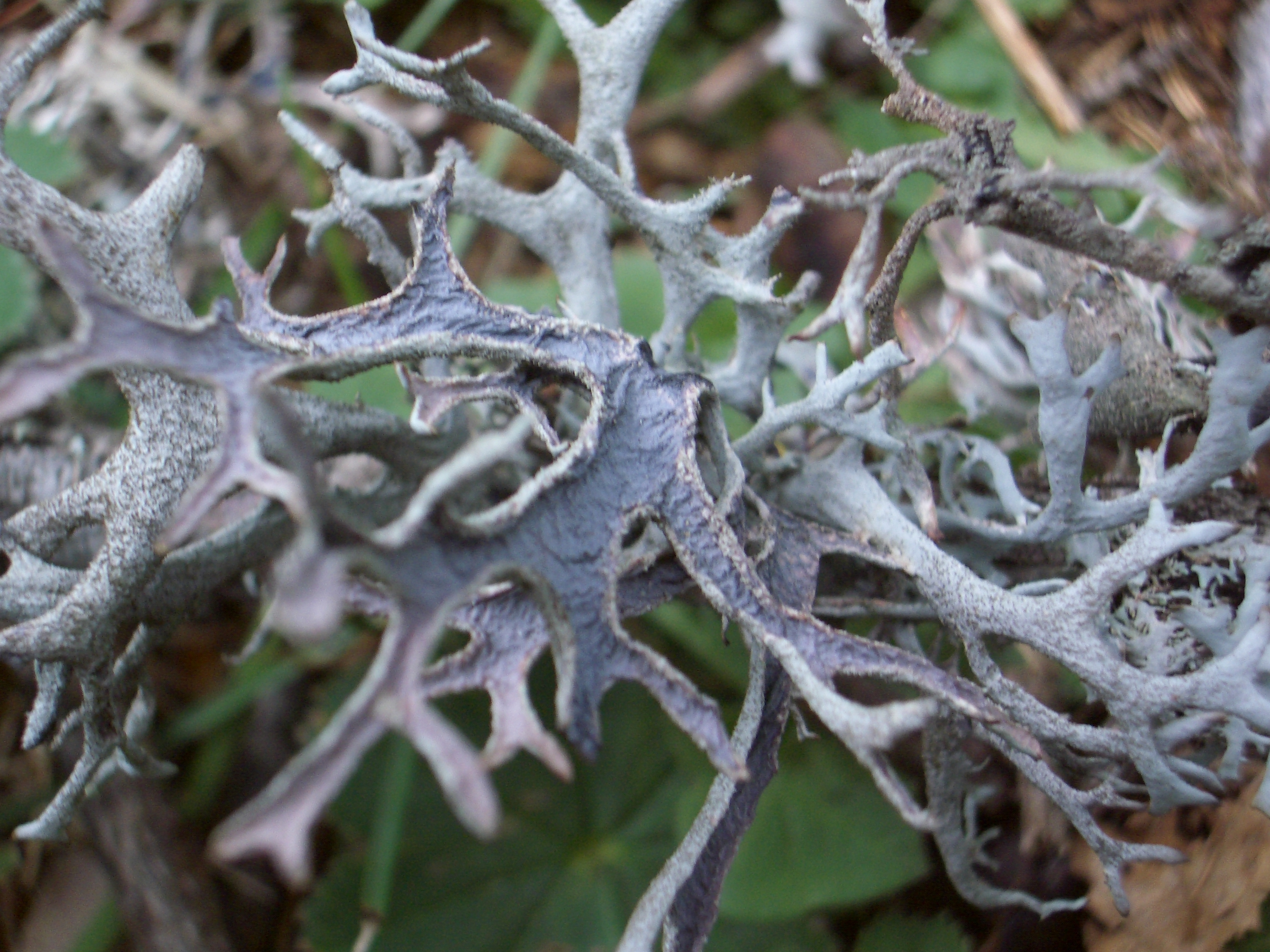
Pseudevernia furfuracea was used in embalming.

Embalming began in Ancient Egypt around 5,000 years ago. The use of lichens in embalming dates to the 18th Dynasty, where Pseudevernia furfuracea was found in an Egyptian vase. The process began with a slit in the abdomen; the organs and viscera were removed. The organs and viscera were wrapped in separate linen packets and replaced in the body or put in canopic jars between the legs. The body cavity was then packed with lichen, sawdust, bruised myrrh, cassia, and other spices. Pseudevernia furfuracea was employed due to its preservative and aromatic qualities. Also it was used simply as a highly absorbent, light-weight packaging material. It also contains antibiotic substances. These qualities helped inhibit bacterial decay of the mummies. Another discovery is that the modern, not antique Egyptians would grind and mix Pseudevernia furfuracea with their flour for bread, an usage observed confirmed by botanist Johannes Müller Argoviensis amongst others in 19th century Cairo. Various lichen mixes called ushna amongst which Evernia Prunastri and Pseudevernia furfuracea were then imported by the shipload from the Grecian archipelago to Alexandria. Antique use of Evernia & Pseudevernia for embalming was conflated with modern 19th c. era bread making tradition in Egypt by vulgarizing 20th century sensationalistic authors mostly claiming ancient Egyptians produced breads of the sort using tree moss despite no archeological proof whatsoever. Today, embalming fluids are colored from the lichen dye orchil into a product called Cudbear, illustrating how a historical procedure can influence future practices.

== Other human uses of lichens ==
Lichens have been and are still being used for many other purposes, including

- Alcohol production (for fermentable carbohydrates, as catalysts, and/or as flavour/preservatives)
- Cosmetics (for hair, and/or sweet smelling powders)
- Perfumes (see Oakmoss)
- Decorations (including costumes and artwork)
- Fibre (clothing, housing, cooking, sanitation)
- Animal feed (both fodder and forage)
- Fuel
- Industrial purposes (production of acid, antibiotic, carbohydrate, litmus)
- Tanning
- Hunting/fishing (to find prey, or to lure them in)
- Navigation
- Insect repellent/insecticide
- Preservatives (for food or beer)
- Rituals
- Tobacco
- Narcotics
- Hallucinogens (see Dictyonema)
