= Arctoparmelia collatolica =

Scientific classification
- Kingdom: Fungi
- Division: Ascomycota
- Class: Lecanoromycetes
- Order: Lecanorales
- Family: Parmeliaceae
- Genus: Arctoparmelia
- Species: A. collatolica

Binomial name
- Arctoparmelia collatolica Chesnokov & Prokopiev (2019)

Species of lichen-forming fungus

Arctoparmelia collatolica is a species of lichen-forming fungus in the family Parmeliaceae. Found in Siberia, it was formally described as a new species in 2019.
