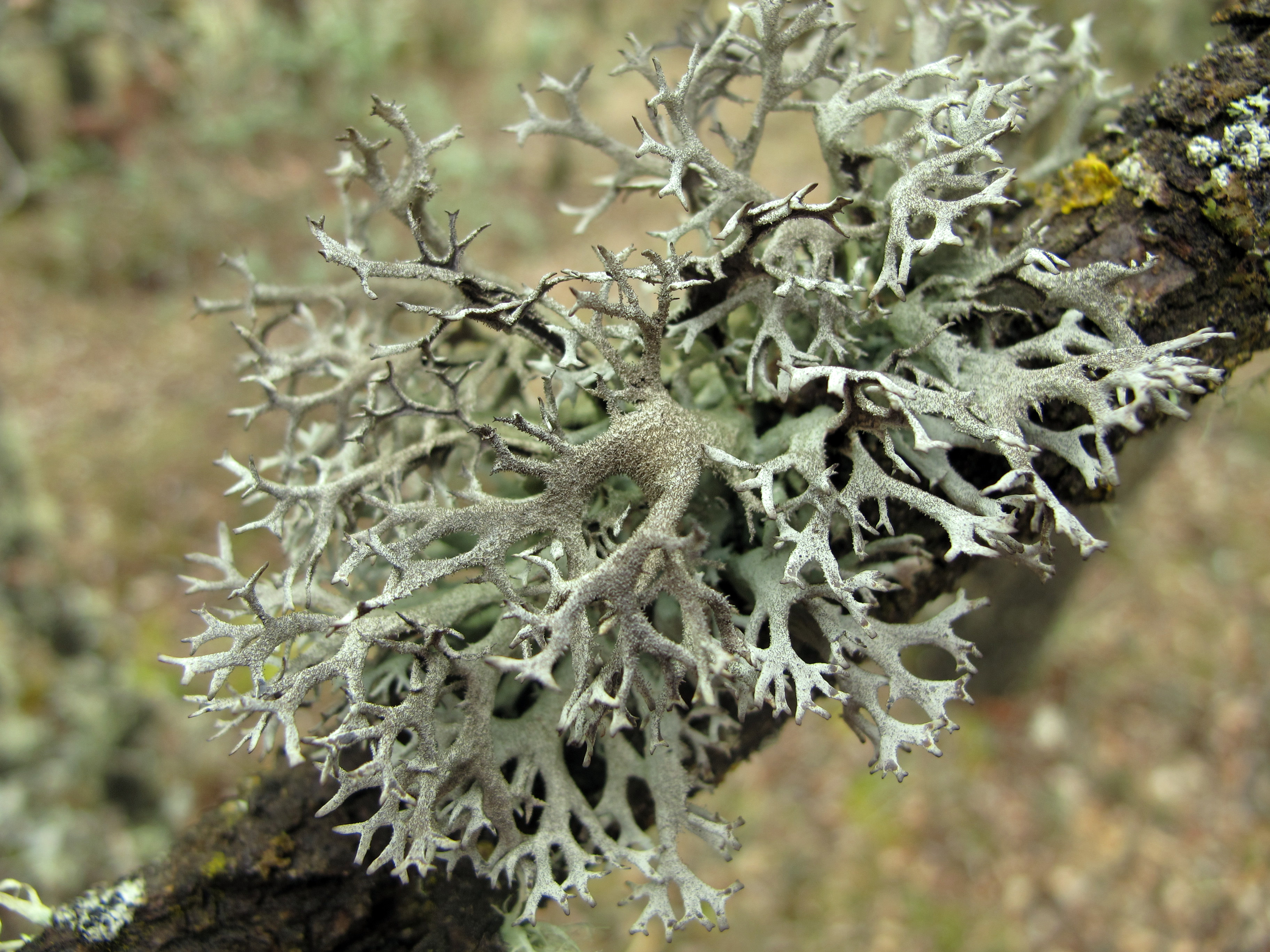
- Pseudevernia furfuracea

Scientific classification
- Kingdom: Fungi
- Division: Ascomycota
- Class: Lecanoromycetes
- Order: Lecanorales
- Family: Parmeliaceae
- Genus: Pseudevernia; Zopf (1903)

Type species
- Pseudevernia furfuracea (L.) Zopf (1903)

= Pseudevernia =

Genus of lichens

Pseudevernia is a genus of foliose lichens in the family Parmeliaceae. The type species of the genus, Pseudevernia furfuracea (commonly known as tree moss), has substantial commercial value in the perfume industry.

== Systematics ==
Pseudevernia was circumscribed by German botanist Friedrich Wilhelm Zopf in 1903 with Pseudevernia furfuracea as the type species.

Pseudevernia is a member of the Hypogymnioid clade of the family Parmeliaceae; this clade, which also includes the genera Arctoparmelia, Brodoa, and Hypogymnia, is an evolutionary lineage comprising species occurring in temperate to subpolar regions in both hemispheres. Pseudevernia has been estimated to have diverged from its closest ancestors during the Oligocene at 31.43 Ma, and is the earliest-diverging member of the Hypogymnioid clade.

== Description ==
Pseudevernia lichens generally have a foliose (leafy) thallus, although occasionally it becomes almost fruticose in form. This is the case with P. cladonia, which has intricately branched lobes about 1 mm wide; the lobes of most other Pseudevernia species are 2–4 mm wide. The lower surface of the thallus often darkens to a purplish-black or mottled white colour, a striking feature that is characteristic of this genus.

Several secondary chemicals are produced amongst Pseudevernia lichens. All species in the genus produce atranorin in the cortex, while lecanoric acid, physodic acid, and olivetoric acid occur in the medullae of some species.

== Species ==
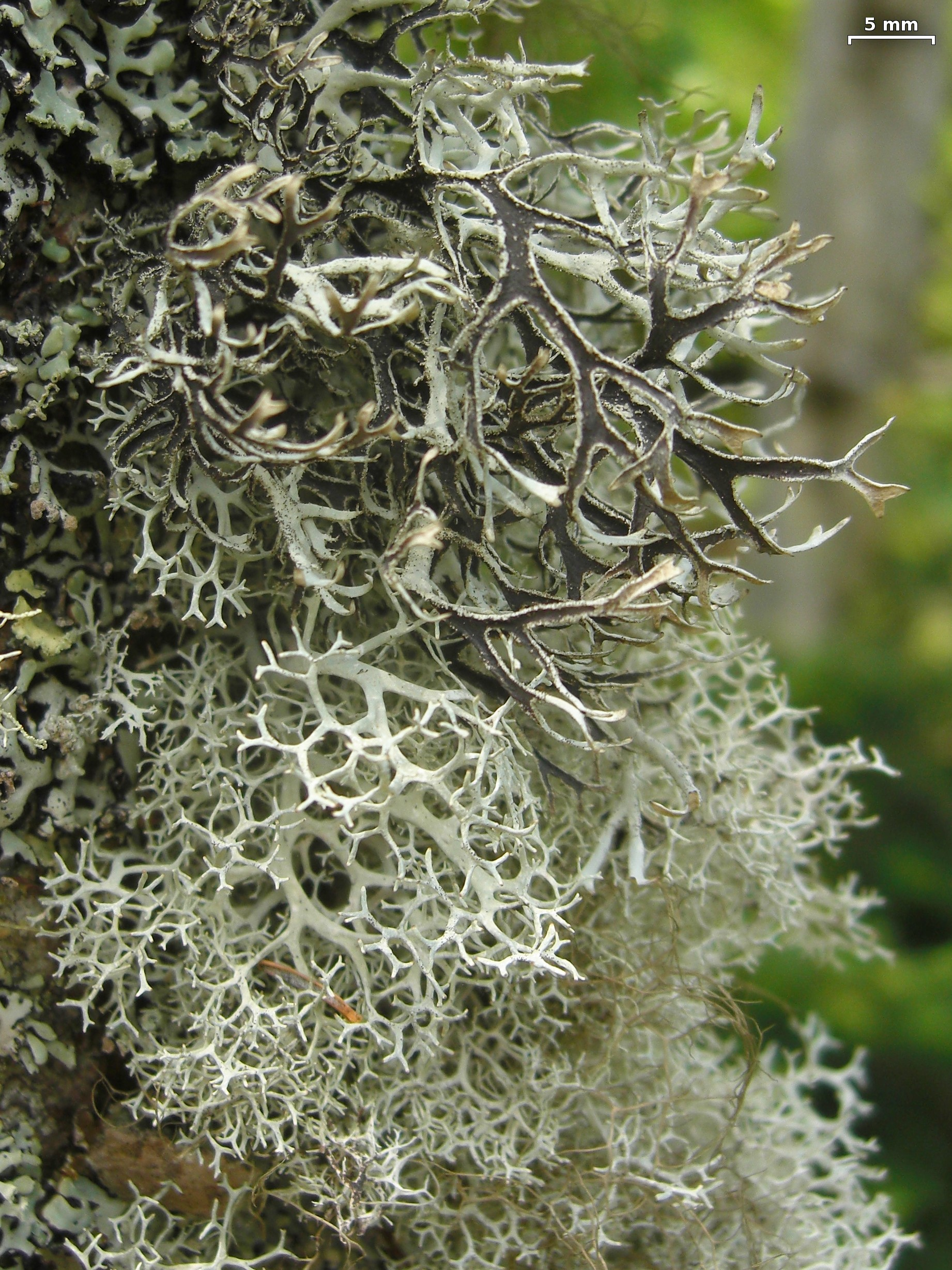
Pseudevernia consocians (top) and P. cladonia (bottom) sharing the same habitat

- Pseudevernia alectoronica Egan (2016) – Mexico
- Pseudevernia cladonia (Tuck.) Hale & W.L.Culb. (1966) – eastern North America; Dominican Republic
- Pseudevernia confusa (Du Rietz) R.Schub. & Klem. (1966)
- Pseudevernia consocians (Vain.) Hale & W.L.Culb. (1966) – North America
- Pseudevernia furfuracea (L.) Zopf (1903) – cosmopolitan
- Pseudevernia intensa (Nyl.) Hale & W.L.Culb. (1966) – North America
- Pseudevernia isidiophora (Zopf) Zopf (1903)
- Pseudevernia mexicana Egan (2016)
- Pseudevernia soralifera (Bitter) Zopf (1903) – Europe

Some species once classified in Pseudevernia have since been reduced to synonymy with other species, or have been transferred to other genera. These include:

- Pseudevernia cirrhata (Fr.) R.Schub. & Klem. (1966) is now known as Hypotrachyna cirrhata.
- Pseudevernia kamerunensis (J.Steiner) C.W.Dodge (1959) is now known as Hypotrachyna sorocheila.
- Pseudevernia molliuscula (Ach.) C.W.Dodge (1959) and Pseudevernia thamnidiella (Stirt.) C.W.Dodge (1959) are synonymous Xanthoparmelia molliuscula.
- Pseudevernia olivetorina (Zopf) Zopf (1903) and Pseudevernia ericetorum (Fr.) Zopf (1905) have been folded into synonymy with Pseudevernia furfuracea.
- Pseudevernia mauritiana (Gyeln.) C.W.Dodge (1959) is synonymous with Parmelia microblasta.
- Pseudevernia polita (Fr.) C.W.Dodge (1959) is now Parmotrema cetratum.

Molecular phylogenetic analysis suggests that the North American species P. consocians and P. intensa do not form separate monophyletic groups, and so might be the same species.
