= Orcein =

Dye extracted from certain lichens

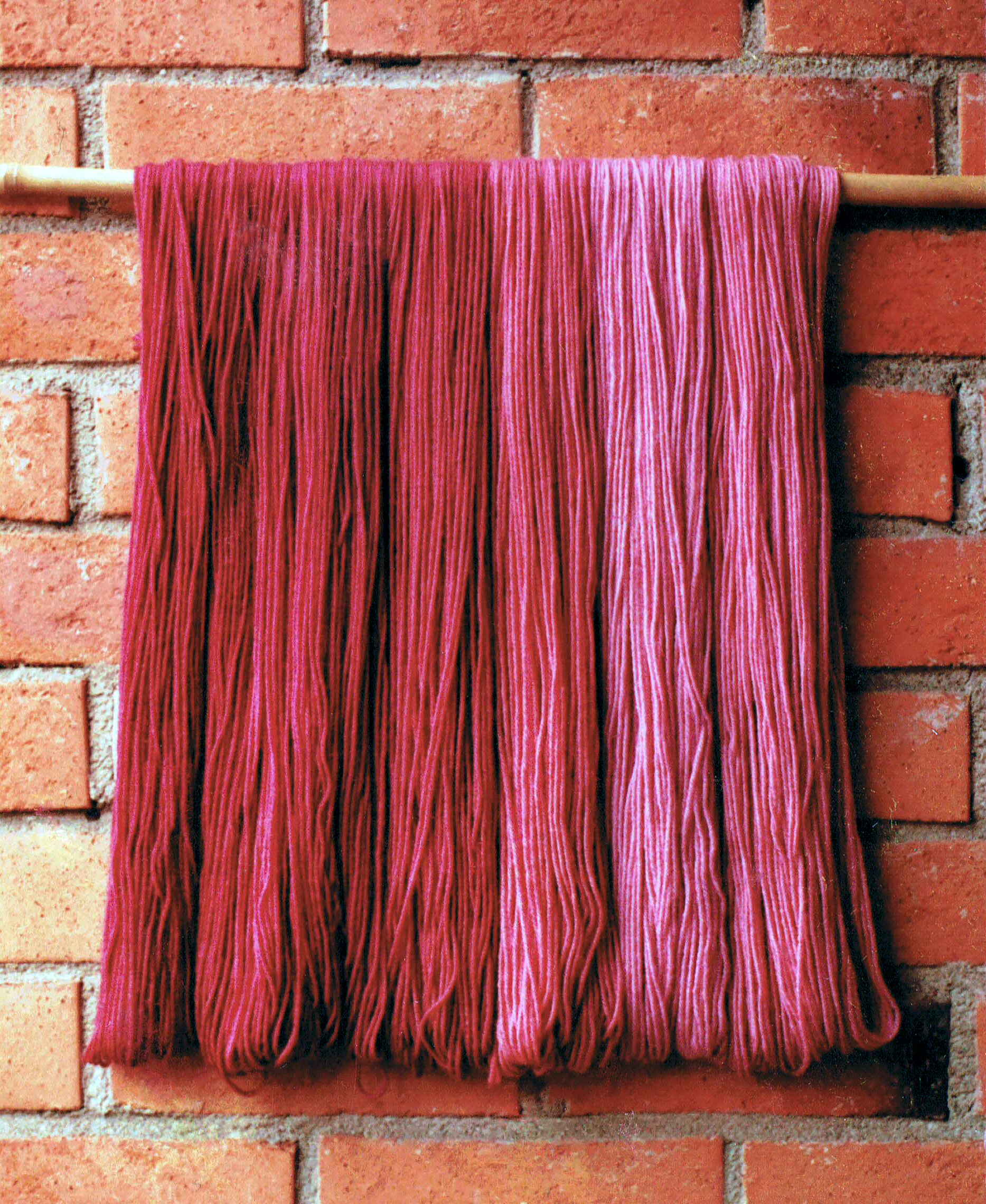
White wool yarn dyed with "orchella weeds", using traditional plant dye methods.

Orcein, also called archil, orchil, lacmus and C.I. Natural Red 28 - CICN 758600, is any dye extracted from several species of lichen, commonly known as "orchella weeds", found in various parts of the world. A major source is the archil lichen, Roccella tinctoria. Orcinol is extracted from such lichens. It is then converted to orcein by ammonia and air. In traditional dye-making methods, urine was used as the ammonia source. If the conversion is carried out in the presence of potassium carbonate, calcium hydroxide, and calcium sulfate (in the form of potash, lime, and gypsum in traditional dye-making methods), the result is litmus, a more complex molecule. The manufacture was described by Cocq in 1812 and in the UK in 1874. Edmund Roberts noted orchilla as a principal export of the Cape Verde islands, superior to the same kind of "moss" found in Italy or the Canary Islands, that in 1832 was yielding an annual revenue of $200,000. Commercial archil is either a powder (called cudbear) or a paste. It is red in acidic pH and blue in alkaline pH.

== History and uses ==
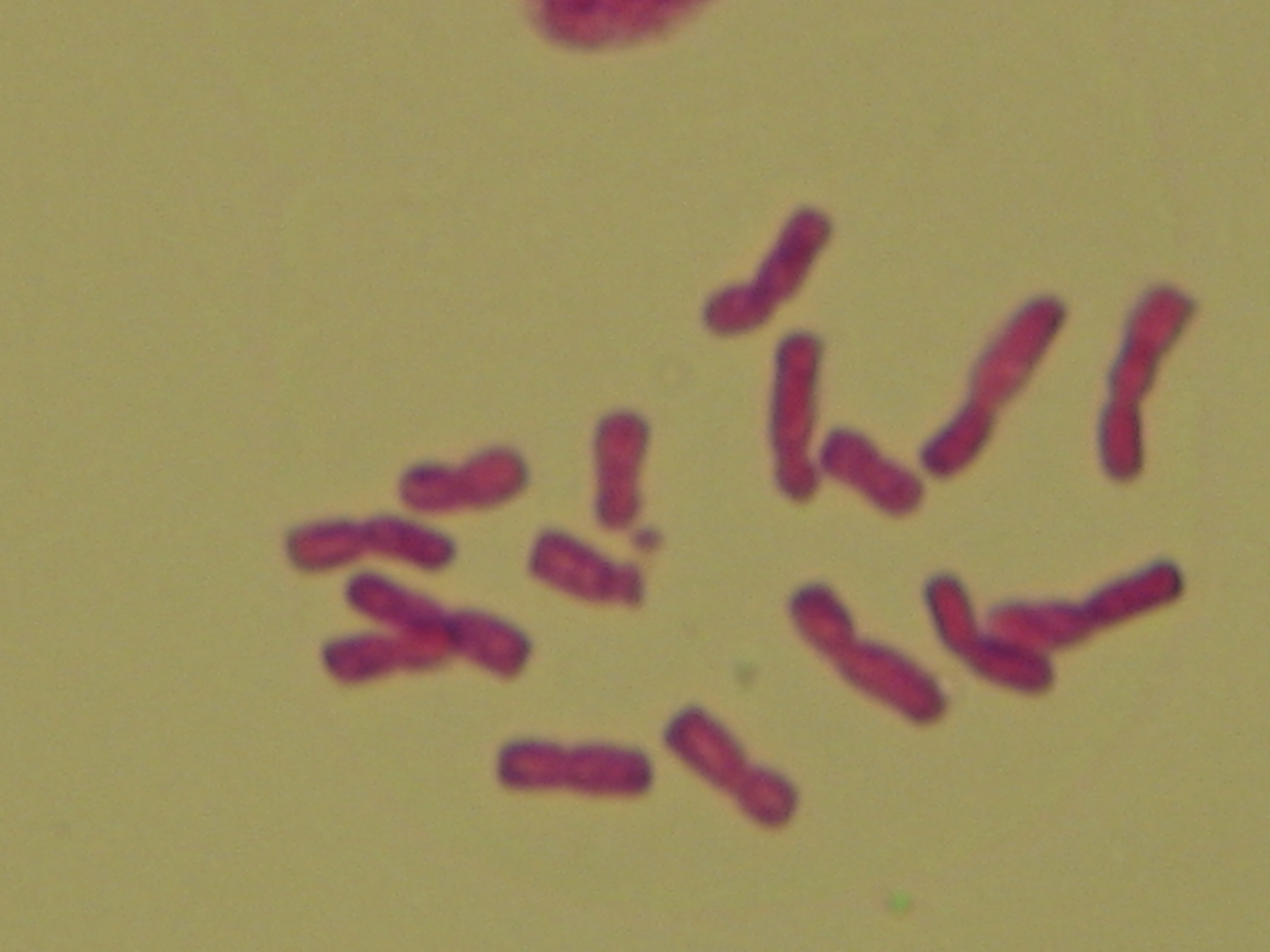
Chromosomes of Allium ascalonicum stained with orcein

The chemical components of orcein were elucidated only in the 1950s by Hans Musso. The structures are shown below. A paper originally published in 1961, embodying most of Musso's work on components of orcein and litmus, was translated into English and published in 2003 in a special issue of the journal Biotechnic & Histochemistry (Vol 78, No. 6) devoted to the dye.

Orcein is a reddish-brown dye, orchil is a purple-blue dye. Orcein is also used as a stain in microscopy to visualize chromosomes, elastic fibers, Hepatitis B surface antigens, and copper-associated proteins.

Orcein is not approved as a food dye (banned in Europe since January 1977), with E number E121 before 1977 and E182 after. Its CAS number is 1400-62-0. Its chemical formula is C_{28}H_{24}N_{2}O_{7}. It forms dark brown crystals. It is a mixture of phenoxazone derivates - hydroxyorceins, aminoorceins, and aminoorceinimines.

== Cudbear ==
Cudbear is a dye extracted from orchil lichens that produces colours in the purple range. It can be used to dye wool and silk, without the use of mordant. The lichen is first boiled in a solution of ammonium carbonate. The mixture is then cooled and ammonia is added and the mixture is kept damp for 3–4 weeks. Then the lichen is dried and ground to powder.

Cudbear was the first dye to be invented in modern times, and one of the few dyes to be credited to a named individual: Dr Cuthbert Gordon of Scotland, who is various cited as naming it after himself or for his mother. Production began in 1758, and it was patented in 1758, British patent 727. John Glassford invested in the new process with funds from his slave-labor tobacco business by establishing a dyeworks in Dennistoun in 1777. The manufacture details were carefully protected, with a ten-feet high wall being built around the manufacturing facility, and staff consisting of Highlanders sworn to secrecy. The lichen consumption soon reached 250 tons per year and import from Norway and Sweden had to be arranged.

A similar process was developed in France. The lichen is extracted by urine or ammonia, then the extract is acidified, the dissolved dye precipitates out and is washed. Then it is dissolved in ammonia again, the solution is heated in air until it becomes purple, then it is precipitated out with calcium chloride. The resulting insoluble purple solid is known as French purple, a fast lichen dye that was much more stable than other lichen dyes.

== Gallery ==
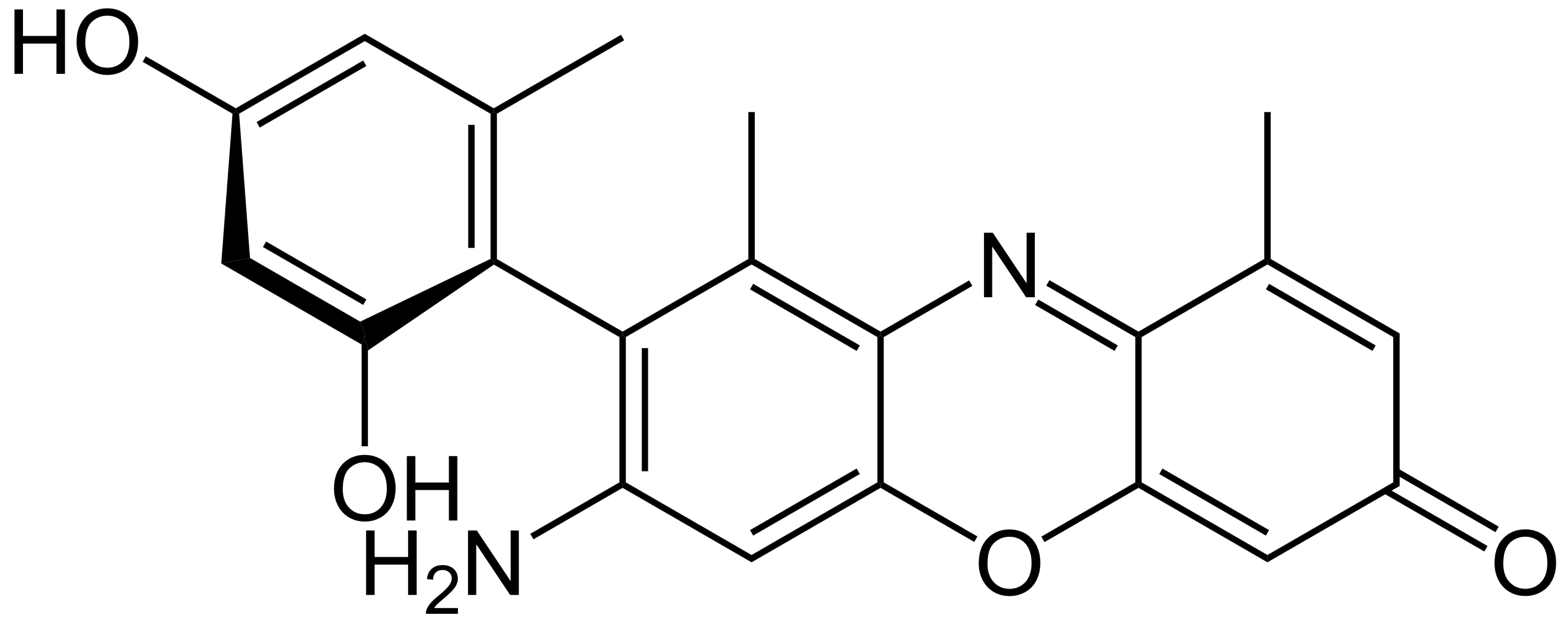
α-amino orcein

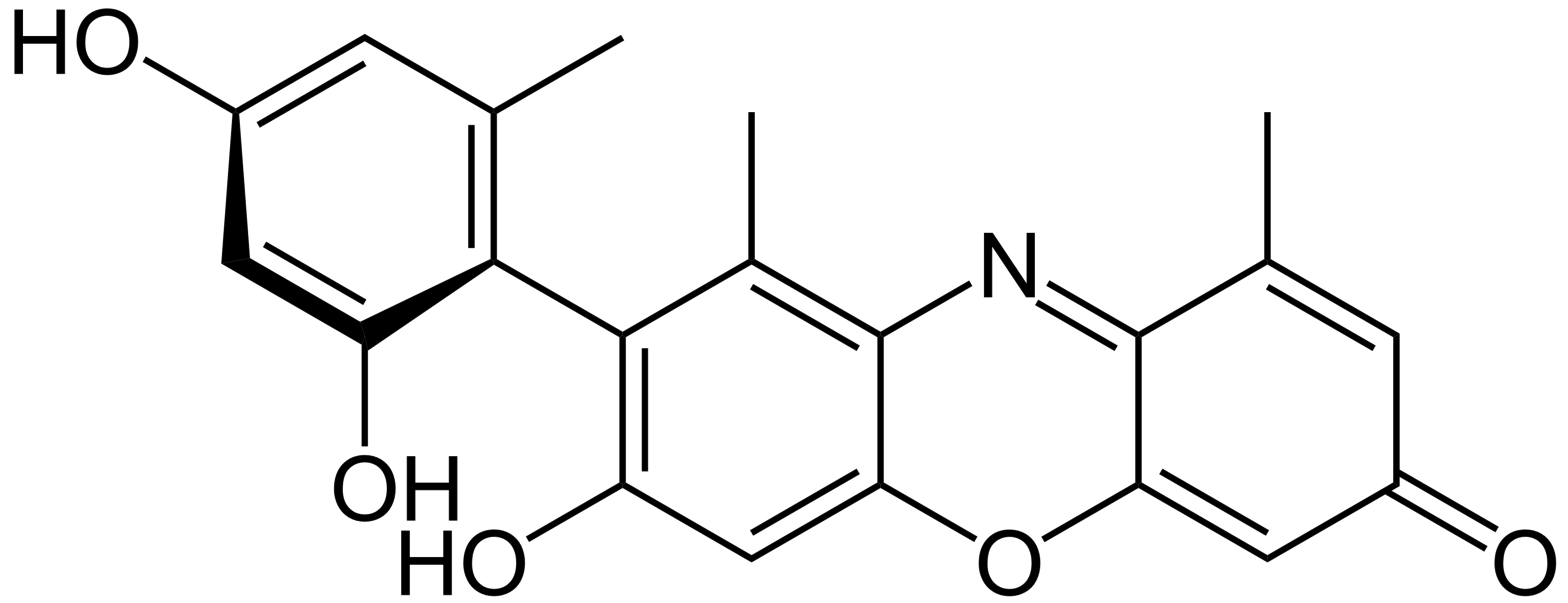
α-hydroxy orcein

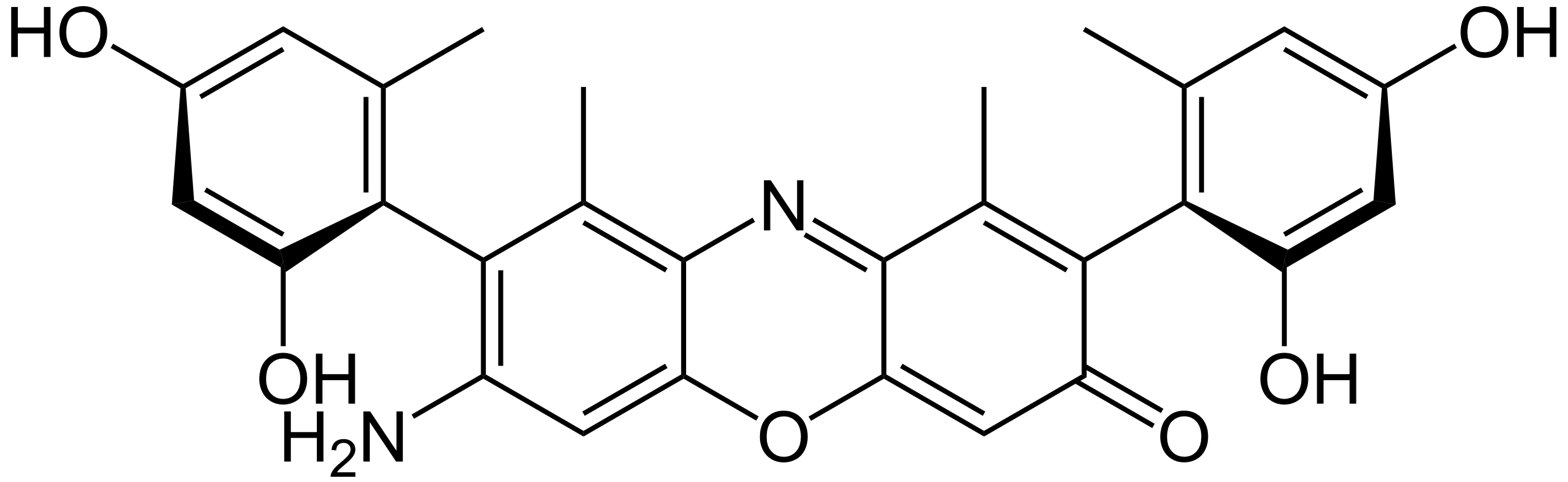
β-amino orcein

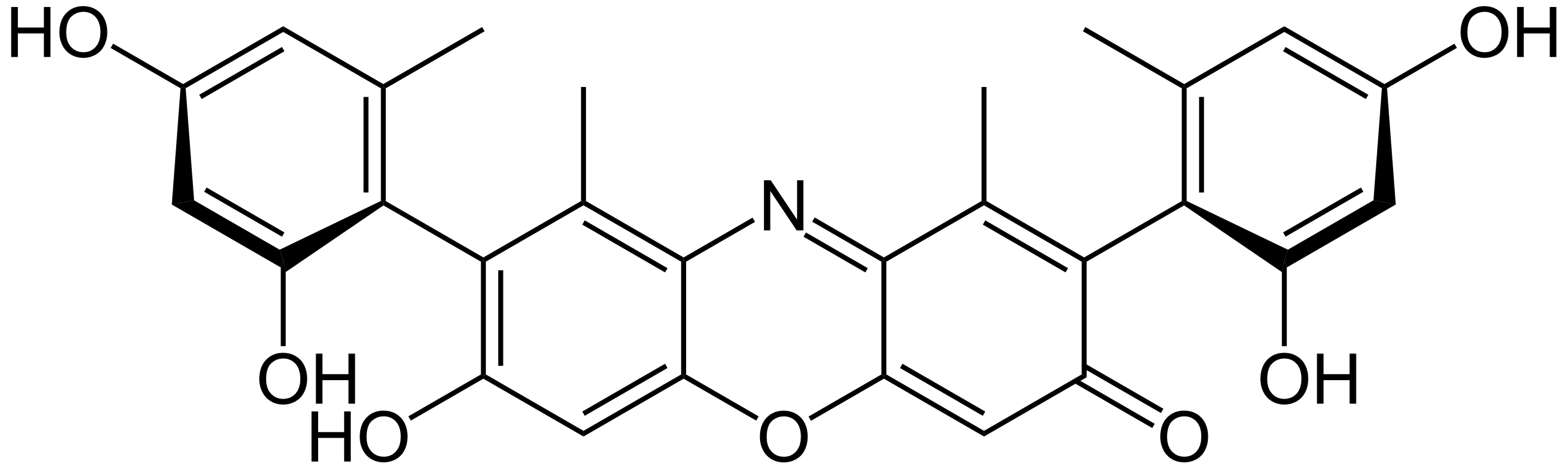
β-hydroxy orcein

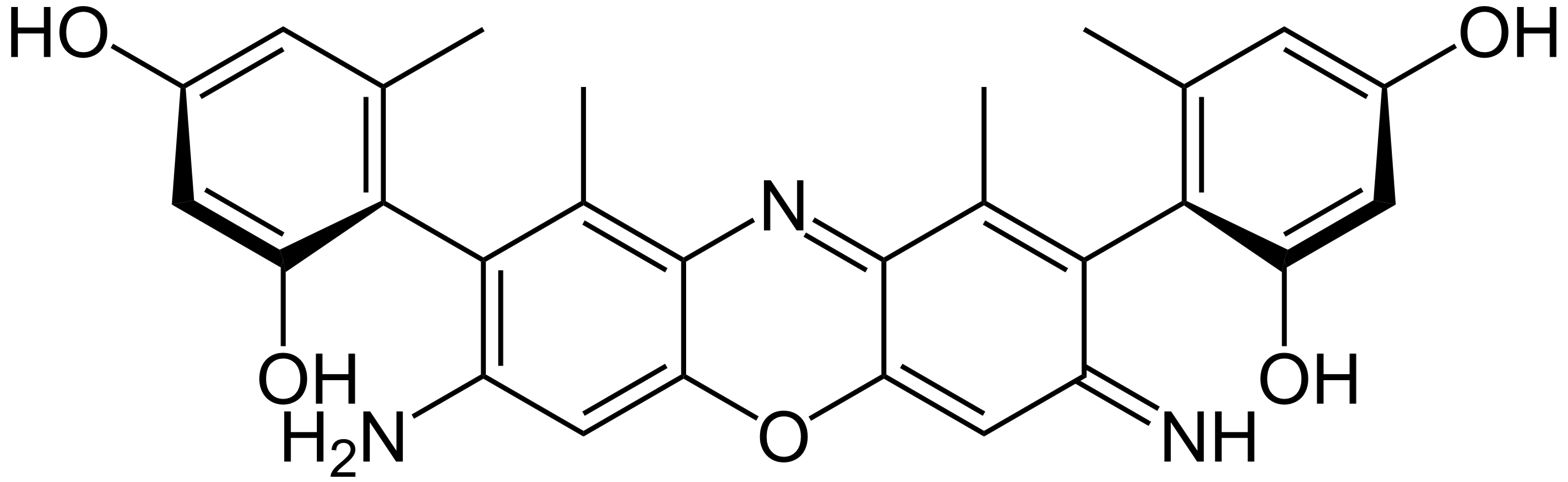
β-amino orceinimine

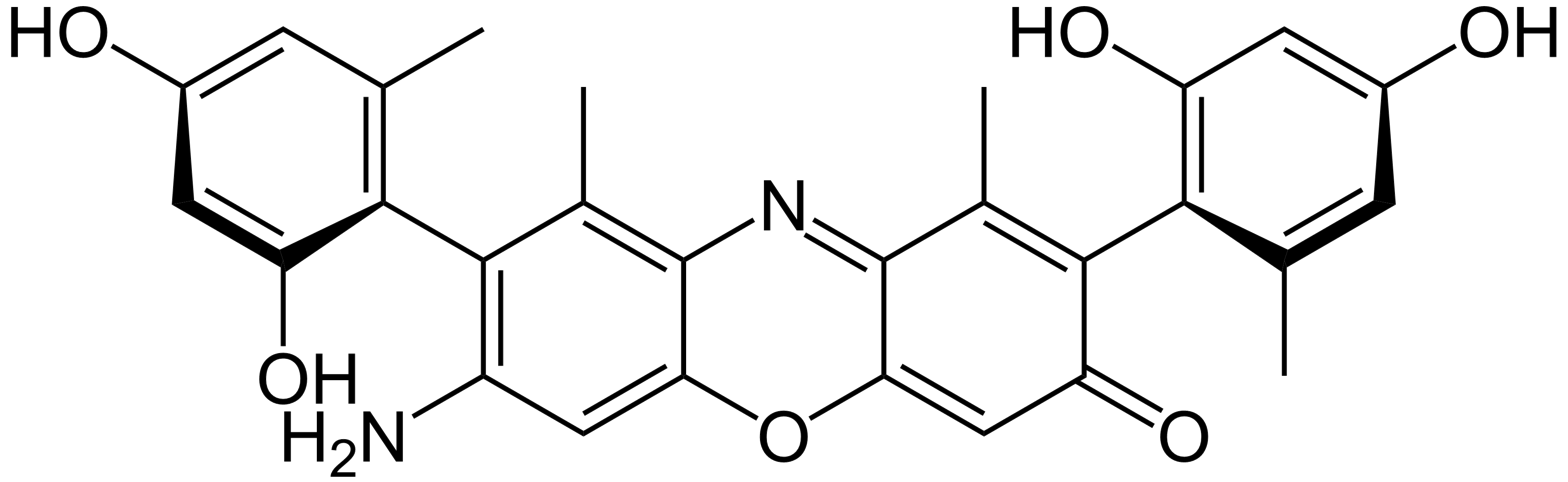
γ-amino orcein

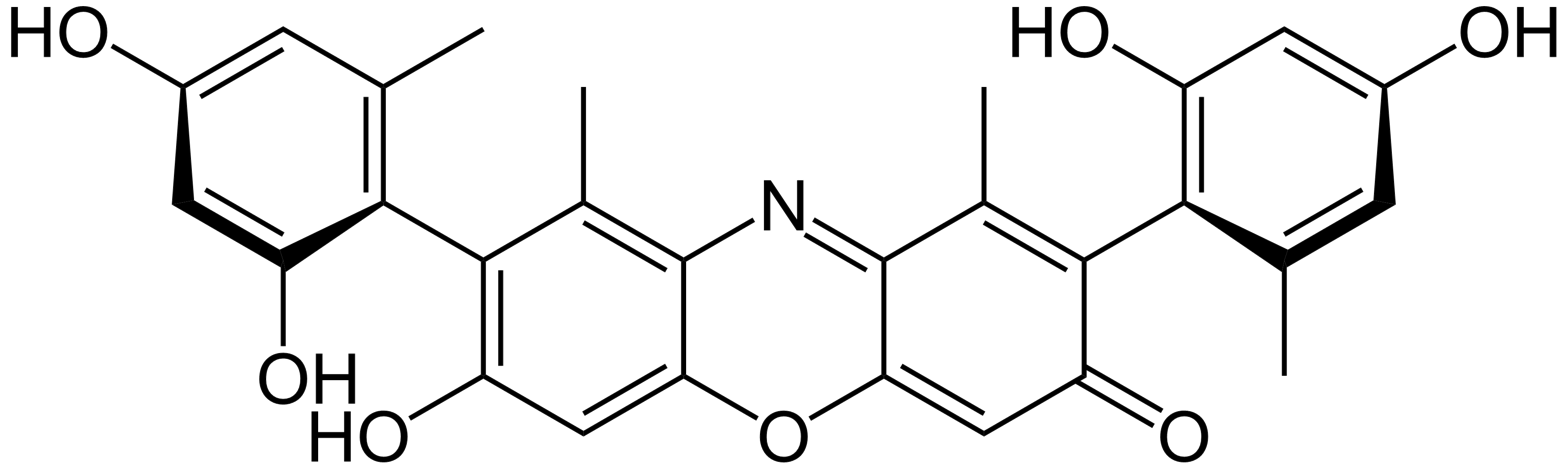
γ-hydroxy orcein

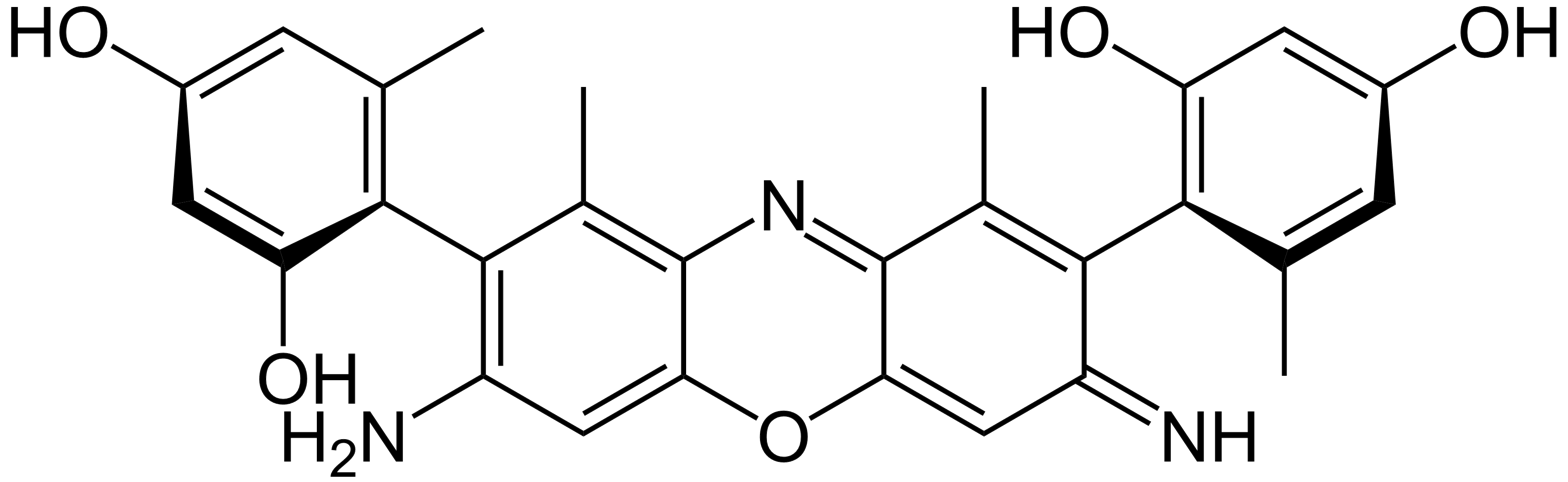
γ-amino orceinimine

== See also ==
- Litmus test
- Ethnolichenology
