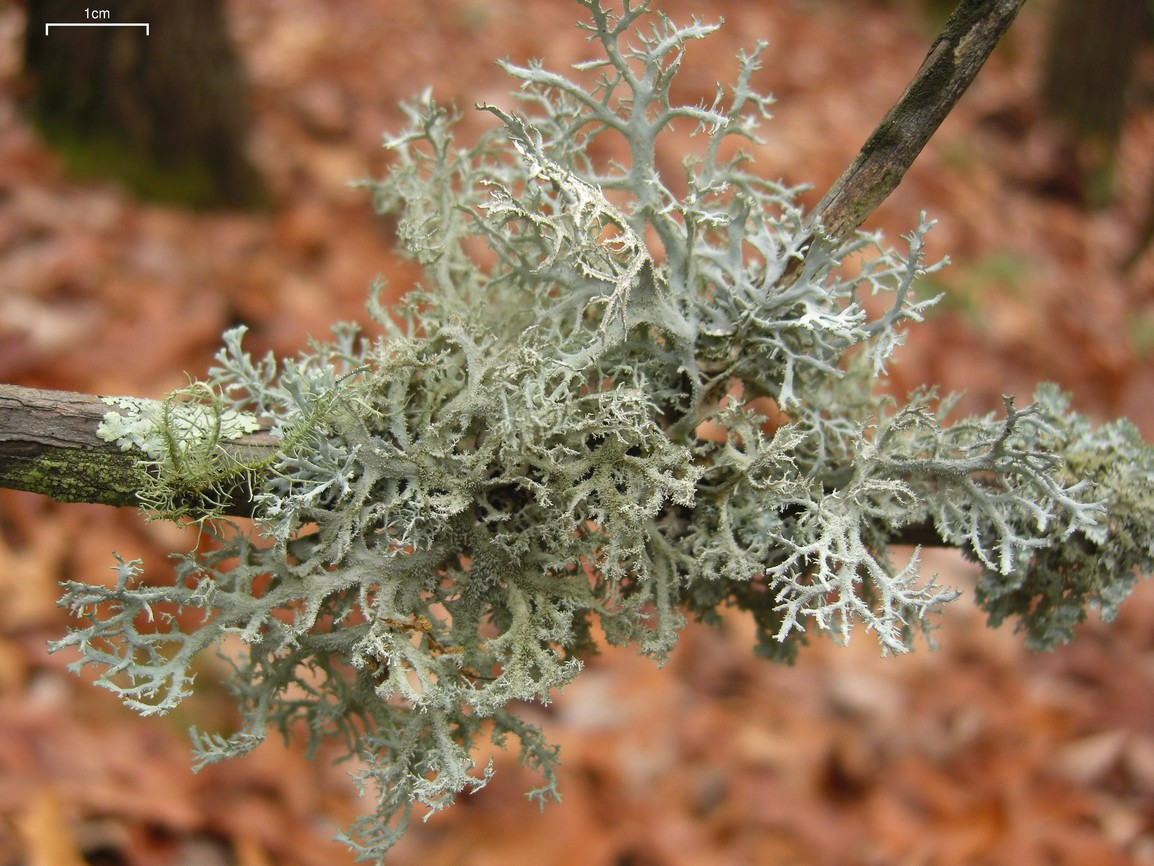
- in the Great Smoky Mountains National Park, U.S.

Scientific classification
- Domain: Eukaryota
- Kingdom: Fungi
- Division: Ascomycota
- Class: Lecanoromycetes
- Order: Lecanorales
- Family: Parmeliaceae
- Genus: Pseudevernia
- Species: P. consocians

Binomial name
- Pseudevernia consocians (Vain.) Hale & W.L.Culb. (1966)

Synonyms
- Evernia prunastri var. candidula Ach. (1814); Parmelia consocians Vain. (1926)

= Pseudevernia consocians =

Species of lichen

Pseudevernia consocians is a species of lichen in the family Parmeliaceae. It is found in both North America and Central America. Some characteristic features of Pseudevernia consocians are its well-developed, numerous isidia, relatively narrow lobes, and the presence of the lichen product lecanoric acid.

== Taxonomy ==
The lichen was originally described as new to science in 1926 by Finnish lichenologist Edvard August Vainio. The type specimen was collected by Danish botanist Frederik Liebmann between Cerro León and La Hoya, Mexico. Mason Hale and William Louis Culberson transferred the taxon to the genus Pseudevernia in a 1966 publication.

== Description ==
Pseudevernia consocians has a thallus form that can range from leafy (foliose) to somewhat bushy (fruticose). It usually measures between 4 and 10 cm (1.6 and 3.9 in) in diameter, and it has a smooth texture with a grayish hue. The lobes that compose the thallus are linear and dichotomously branched, overlapping each other with truncated tips, and they are typically 0.3–1.5 mm wide (some are up to 3 mm wide). Cylindrical isidia are abundant on the thallus surface, presenting tips that are darker than the rest of the thallus. The medulla is loosely packed and has a white coloration. The lower thallus surface is attached through basal holdfasts (without rhizines), with a color ranging from tan to black, sometimes with occasional white mottling. The pycnidia are positioned in either a laminal or marginal arrangement, and they can present as immersed, emergent, or sessile.

Other superficially similar species are Pseudevernia cladonia and Evernastrum catawbiense. The former can be distinguished from Pseudevernia consocians by the lack of isidia, while the latter produces soralia rather than isidia.

The expected results for standard chemical spot tests are as follows: upper cortex K+ (yellow), and medulla K−, C+ (red), KC+ (red), and P−. The cortex contains atranorin and chloroatranorin as major and minor lichen products, respectively, while the medulla contains lecanoric acid as the major substance.

The photobiont partner of Pseudevernia consocians is the green algal species Trebouxia jamesii.

== Habitat and distribution ==
Pseudevernia consocians has a distribution that encompasses the mountains of Mexico, extending further south into Central America. In addition, it is found growing in the Great Lakes and Appalachian region of eastern North America, with disjunct populations extending into Western Canada. It is common on conifers, with a particular preference for pine trees. In the Appalachian Mountains, it occurs in dry and acidic environments, particularly in middle-to-high elevation habitats, where it grows between plates of bark and on branches.
