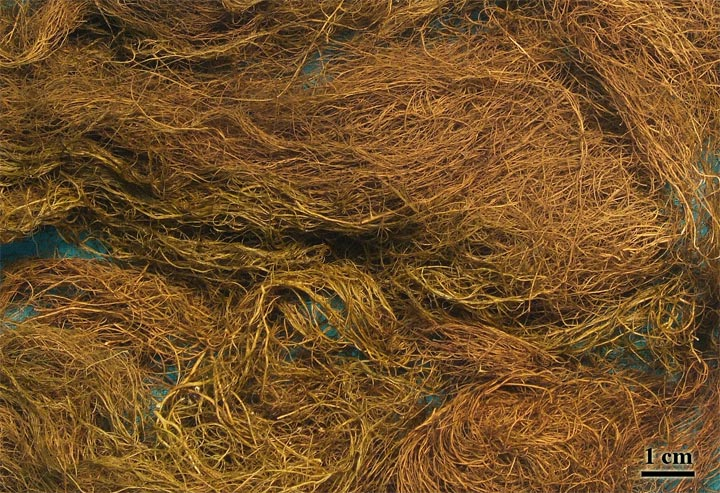

Conservation status
- Least Concern (IUCN 3.1)

- Secure (NatureServe)

Scientific classification
- Kingdom: Fungi
- Division: Ascomycota
- Class: Lecanoromycetes
- Order: Lecanorales
- Family: Parmeliaceae
- Genus: Bryoria
- Species: B. fremontii

Binomial name
- Bryoria fremontii (Tuck.) Brodo & D. Hawksw.

Synonyms
- Alectoria fremontii Tuck. (1858)

= Bryoria fremontii =

Species of fungus

Bryoria fremontii is a dark brown horsehair lichen that grows hanging from trees in western North America, and northern Europe and Asia. It grows abundantly in some areas, and is an important traditional food for a few First Nations in North America.

== Name ==
The species is currently classified as Bryoria fremontii, although it is sometimes identified by the older classification of Alectoria jubata. Several different English names have been used for this lichen including black moss, black tree lichen and edible horsehair lichen. There are names for this lichen in at least 20 different indigenous languages in North America. Wila (wee-la) is the Secwepemc language name for the lichen. The Nez Perce name is hóopop and the Sahaptin name is k'ʷɨnč.

== Description ==
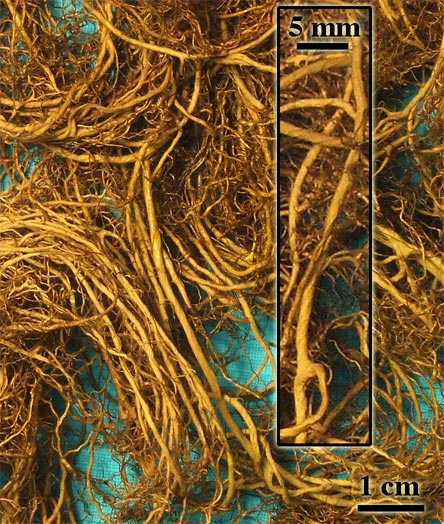
A specimen of Bryoria fremontii. Its thick, contorted main stems are distinctive of this species of Bryoria

Bryoria fremontii, like almost all of the 23 other species of Bryoria found in North America, is a dark brown hair lichen that grow on trees (mostly conifers). Differentiating the different species of Bryoria can be difficult. The simplest characteristic that distinguishes it from the other species of Bryoria is that its main branches grow to be quite thick (greater than 0.4 mm wide), and usually become somewhat flattened, twisted, and wrinkled in older specimens. Other species of Bryoria usually have narrower main branches. It can also grow to be a lot longer than other species of Bryoria, and is the only species in this genus in North America that regularly grows longer than 20 cm (occasionally reaching 90 cm in length). It is often slightly darker in colour than most other species of Bryoria, although there is much variation in this characteristic. Soredia and apothecia are uncommon, but when they are present they are very distinctive, as they are both bright yellow.

=== Differentiating poisonous specimens ===
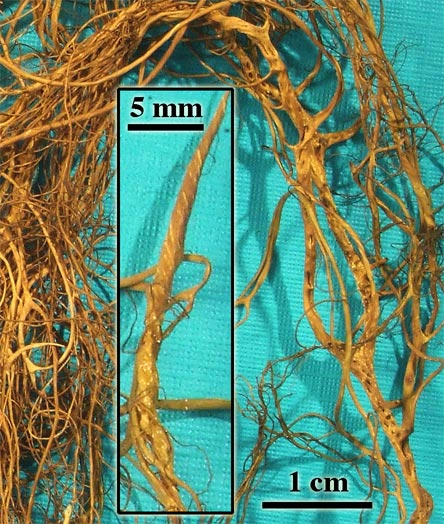
Distinct yellow pseudocyphellae indicate that this specimen of Bryoria fremontii is high in vulpinic acid

The lichen usually does not contain any secondary lichen substances. However, some specimens are quite high in vulpinic acid. These specimens are often classified as a separate species, Bryoria tortuosa; in 1992, it was posited that they are different morphotypes of the same species, but in 2016, it was discovered that the difference is the result of the presence or absence of a basidiomycete as an additional symbiont. Vulpinic acid is both toxic and bright yellow, and, besides making the lichen poisonous, it can also give the lichen a yellowish tint. As a result, although it is usually reddish-brown to dark brown, some specimens can be yellowish-brown or even bright yellow.

All yellowish specimens of this lichen should be considered to be poisonous. However, not all poisonous specimens are distinctly yellow. Often the vulpinic acid is concentrated in the interior of each branch, and is not apparent from the colour of the surface of the lichen. A more reliable characteristic to distinguish the poisonous specimens from the edible ones is that the specimens that contain vulpinic acid usually have abundant, long, yellow pseudocyphellae that twist around the main branches (these require a hand lens to see).

== Distribution ==
This species is common in the mountainous areas of western North America, being found throughout most of the interior of British Columbia (less common or absent in the northern third of the province), extending east into the Alberta Rockies, and south into Montana, Idaho, and Wyoming, as well as being found in Washington, Oregon, and California. It also grows in Europe and Russia.

== Ecology ==
Hanging on conifer branches in freezing fog in the Okanagan Highlands

In North America it is usually found at elevations between 1,200 and 2,300m, and rarely as low as 700m. It grows mainly on conifer trees, although it can be found growing on just about any tree species within its range.

In general, most species of Bryoria prefer drier forests with more open canopies than do the other genera of arboreal hair lichens (like Alectoria, Usnea, and Ramalina). This lichen prefers even drier and more open habitats than most other Bryoria species, and within a forest it is most abundant on the trees and parts of trees that are less shaded. As a result, it is particularly abundant on dead and dying trees; on older, defoliated branches of living trees; and higher up on trees.

Bryoria fremontii can be very abundant in some ecosystems. Researchers have documented up to 3291 kg of arboreal hair lichens (of which this species was a major constituent) per hectare in some areas in the interior of British Columbia. It contains small amounts of protein (2.5 – 5% dry weight) and significant quantities of the lichen carbohydrate lichenin (15 – 35% dry weight), which is digestible to some animals. As a result of its abundance and potential nutrition, it can be very important to the ecology of an area. In interior British Colombia's the inland temperate rainforests, Bryoria fremontii reaches its greatest loads in the mid to upper canopy of old-growth conifer stands, where good air flow and stable branch architecture favour long, pendulous thalli. Stand-level "hyperabundance" is seldom achieved in younger forests, typically appearing only about 120–150 years after disturbance. A large share of annual growth is shed as litterfall; fragments lodge on lower branches and, in winter, accumulate on the snow surface. Researchers refer to this sustained, fragment-driven availability of forage as the "manna effect", which helps explain why late-winter diets of deep-snow mountain caribou are dominated by Bryoria species, including B. fremontii.

Bryoria fremontii (along with many other lichens) is significant food source for a variety of different species of ungulates and rodents. In North America it is particularly important for the northern flying squirrel (Glaucomys sabrinus) and the woodland caribou (Rangifer tarandus caribou). The northern flying squirrel eats large quantities of the lichen, particularly in the winter, when it is often the only thing that it eats. This squirrel also uses it to build its nest. During the winter the woodland caribou in British Columbia and Washington survives almost entirely on arboreal lichens, and this is one of the species of lichen that it prefers the most.

== Uses ==
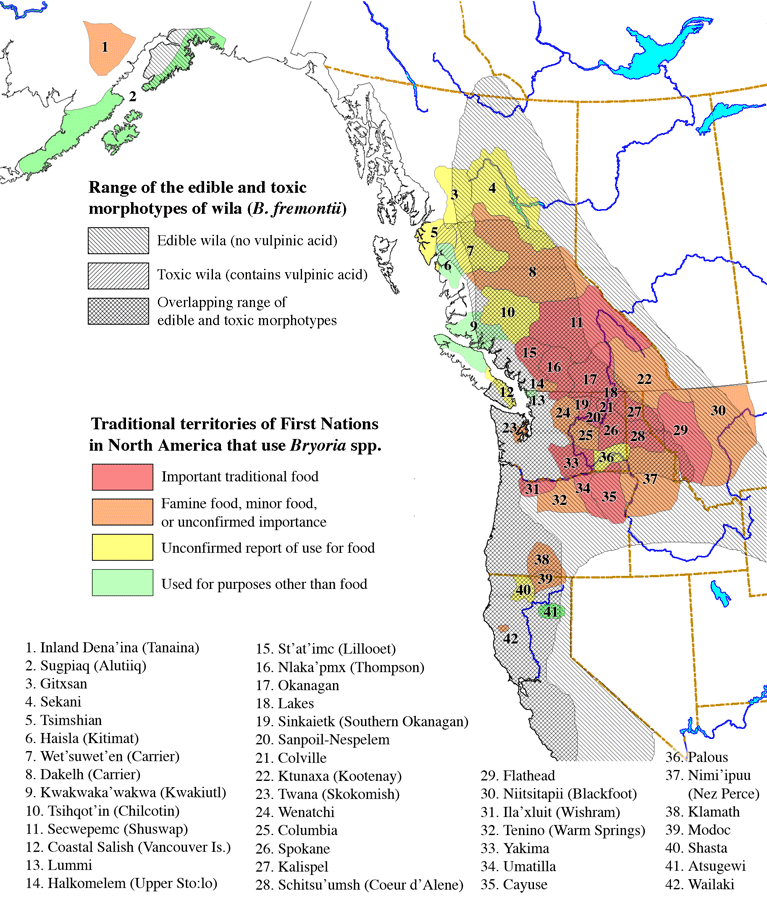
Traditional territories of First Nations that traditionally use Bryoria species

=== Culinary use ===
Like all lichens, Bryoria fremontii stores its energy in polysaccharides which are completely indigestible to humans. Nonetheless, this lichen was, and still is, highly regarded as a food for Salish peoples, such as the Secwepemc, the Shuswap, the Nlaka'pamux, the Lillooet, and the Sinkaietk There is a report that among the Flathead of Montana, even the smallest family would harvest over 10 kg of it every July.

It is theorised that these peoples may consume the lichen because when it is cooked with other foods, it may capture carbohydrates from these other foods that would otherwise be lost in the fire pit method used to cook it, increasing the carbohydrates by 23 to 122%.

It often grows high in trees and can thus be difficult to harvest. The most common way to collect the lichen is by twisting the lichen around the end of a long stick (which is sometimes hooked) and then pulling the lichen down off the tree. This lichen-collecting stick is called a txipmn in the Okanagan language. The lichen can be collected at any time of year, but it is important to choose the right type of lichen. Some specimens are toxic due to vulpinic acid. There are numerous other species of Bryoria that look very similar, but are bitter and mildly toxic. The species of tree on which the lichen is growing and the general location of that tree are both thought to be important factors for determining if it is the right type of lichen to eat, but not everyone agrees on which locations and tree species are better. Many people taste the lichen first to make sure that it isn't bitter, and some people choose the lichens that are darker coloured.

The collected specimen is cleaned by hand to remove twigs, dirt, other lichens, sap and other contaminants. Then it is usually soaked several hours to overnight in water, often in running water. It is sometimes worked with hands, or pounded with a paddle-shaped tool while being soaked. This process of cleaning is called kálka in the Secwepemc language, and may help to remove the vulpinic acid, which is slightly water-soluble.

After being cleaned it is traditionally cooked in a pit. The pit is 1 to 3m across and 60 to 90 cm deep. A fire is lit in the pit, and numerous rocks are heated up on the fire until they are very hot. Some people sprinkle some dirt over the rocks after they have been heated up. Then a thick layer of wet vegetation (moss, fern fronds, skunk cabbage leaves, bark, grass or conifer needles) is used to cover the rocks and line the pit. The lichen is piled on top of this vegetation, almost always with layers of root vegetables or other food. The lichen is then covered with more wet vegetation. Often a barrier of large leaves, bark, reed mats, or burlap sacks is placed on top of all the vegetation to stop any detritus from falling into the food. The entire thing is then covered over with a layer of dirt.

Water is usually added to the pit after it has been covered. This is accomplished by holding a large stick upright in the pit as it is being filled with the dirt, vegetation, and food. This stick is pulled out after the pit is completely covered, leaving a small hole that extends right down to the hot rocks at the bottom. Water is poured down this resulting hole, and then it is sealed with dirt. Then a fire is usually built on top of the pit, and the lichen is left to cook for anywhere from overnight to several days. When it is dug up it has formed a black, gelatinous dough about a quarter of its original volume.

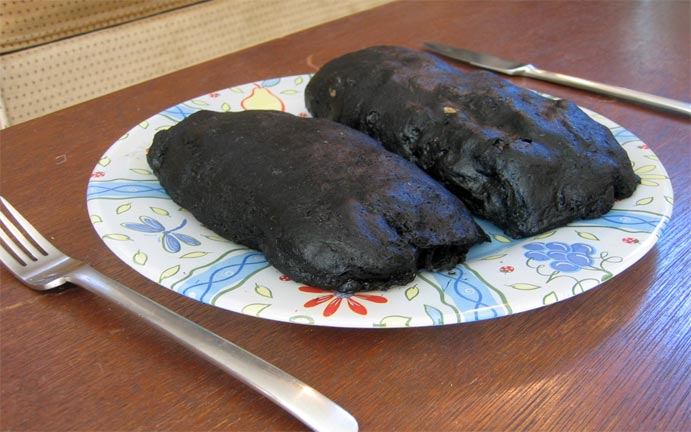
Loaves of lichen from a cooking pit

It is often eaten freshly cooked. Sugar is often added, and sometimes cream, berries or fish eggs. The loaves are sometimes dried into cakes and stored for future use. Sometimes berry juice is added before it is dried. These dried cakes can be stored for many years. Before being eaten, they are usually boiled in water or soup to rehydrate them. Alternately, instead of boiling the cakes, some people just soak the cakes overnight in cold water or dip them into soup like crackers. They can also be powdered and boiled in water to make a porridge.

It has sometimes been prepared by simply boiling it in water. The Dakelh have been recorded to bake it into a kind of fruitcake: the lichen is mixed into the bread dough like one would do with raisins. The Okanagan sometimes roast the fresh lichen on a stick over hot coals, turning it frequently. When the lichen is crumbly it is then boiled to the consistency of molasses. This method of preparation is called spatkán in the Okanogan language. The lichen can also be prepared using more modern cooking methods such as pressure cookers, crockpots or clay bakers.

=== Other uses ===
Bryoria fremontii is also used as a medicine. Other species of Bryoria are undoubtedly used for many of these medicinal purposes. The Okanagan use the lichen for baby medicines, and the Nlaka'pmx use it for removing warts. The Atsugewi use it as a poultice for swellings, and the Secwepemc use it for broken bones and for bandages. The Sugpiaq use it for bandages, and as a hot compress in medicinal steam baths. The Nimi'ipuu use it for digestive troubles, and the Flathead as a general tonic. Some Plateau Indian tribes used it to treat arthritis.

It can also be used as a pigment that produces a green dye when boiled in water, which is the different than most of the other species of Bryoria, which all produce yellow-brown to brown dyes. The Haisla use different species of Bryoria to make a black paint, and the Lummi use them to make a dark green dye.

Several different First Peoples in British Columbia (including the St'at'imc and the Nlaka'pmx) traditionally made clothing out of it. Lichen garments were usually only worn by poorer people, as they quickly absorb water and are unsuitable in wet weather. The garments were made by twisting together ropes and weaving them together with plant fibre to form vests, ponchos, shoes and leggings.

Several other minor uses and other Bryoria species take advantage of their fibrous properties. Various First Peoples in British Columbia traditionally mixed these lichens with mud for chinking cracks in houses, as well as using them as liners for moccasins and diapers, and as a predecessor to paper towels for a variety of domestic purposes.

== Culture ==
Bryoria fremontii is featured in the stories of several different First Nations. Both the Secwepemc and the Okanagan have stories that tell how it was originally created from Coyote's hair. It is also featured in some St'at'imc stories. Some Okanagan people claim that neither men nor menstruating women should come near a pit cook when the lichen is cooking, or it will turn out badly, and there is a Nlaka'pmx belief that a bereaved spouse should not eat lichen cake for a full year after the death of their partner.

In an Okanagan story Coyote tries to catch some swans, but they fool him by playing dead. Not realizing that the swans are just faking, Coyote ties them to his son and crawls up a pine tree to get a pitch top for kindling. The swans then flew away with his son, and in Coyote's haste to get down to save him his long hair got caught in the tree. The swans drop Coyote's son to his death, and Coyote has to cut off his hair to get free. Coyote then transformed his hair into the lichen, and pronounces that his valuable hair should not be wasted, rather it should be gathered by the people, and the old women should make it into food.

There is also a similar Secwepemc story. In this account, Coyote is marveling at how easy Spider can go up and down his web. Coyote is so impressed that he tries to copy Spider. Coyote climbs up a tree, and then tries to use his fur as a web to slide down. Of course it doesn't work, and Coyote gets stuck. Luckily, Spider comes along and frees Coyote. Some of Coyote's fur is left on the tree, and Spider proclaims that when the people come to live on the land, the fur will be this lichen, and the people will gather it for food.

== Dangers ==
Bryoria fremontii can be mistaken for numerous other species of Bryoria, all of which look superficially similar. Although Bryoria fremontii is edible, most other species of Bryoria are mildly toxic. Furthermore, in certain areas Bryoria fremontii can contain toxic quantities of vulpinic acid, which is one of the most potent poisons found in lichens.

== See also ==
- Ethnolichenology
