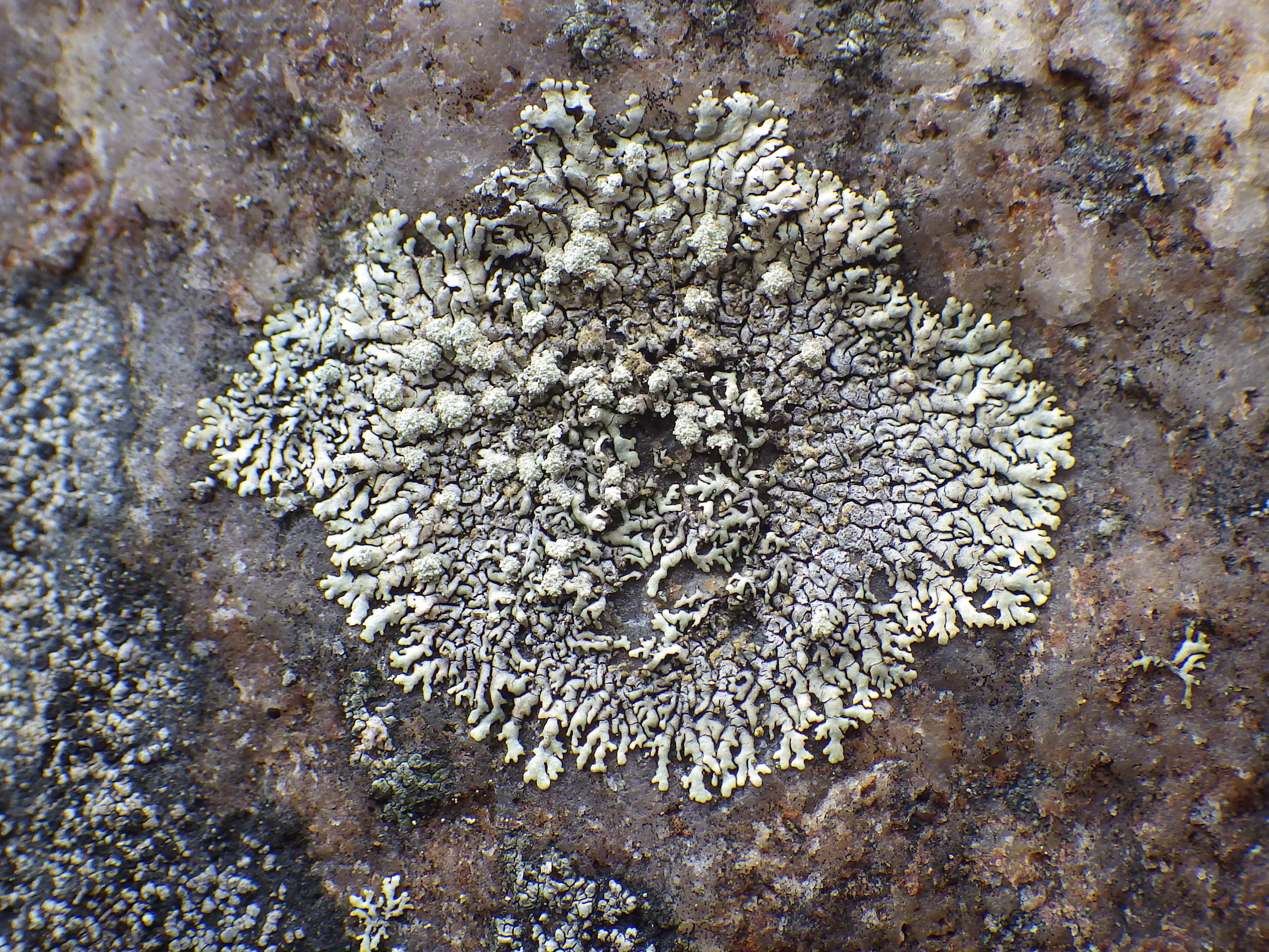
- At Serra de São Mamede, Portugal

Conservation status
- Secure (NatureServe)

Scientific classification
- Kingdom: Fungi
- Division: Ascomycota
- Class: Lecanoromycetes
- Order: Lecanorales
- Family: Parmeliaceae
- Genus: Xanthoparmelia
- Species: X. mougeotii

Binomial name
- Xanthoparmelia mougeotii (Schaer. ex D.Dietr.) Hale (1974)

Synonyms
- Parmelia mougeotii Schaer. ex D.Dietr. (1846); Imbricaria mougeotii (Schaer. ex D.Dietr.) Flot. (1850); Parmelia conspersa var. mougeotii (Schaer. ex D.Dietr.) Leight. (1871)

= Xanthoparmelia mougeotii =

Species of foliose lichen

Xanthoparmelia mougeotii is a species of foliose lichen belonging to the family Parmeliaceae.

== Description ==
The lichen has a foliose thallus that is usually 2–4 cm (0.8–1.6 in) in diameter. It consists of flattened greenish-grey to yellowish-grey lobes (about 0.2–0.5 mm wide) that are closely attached to the substrate. The lower surface is dark brown to black and has short, simple rhizines that are 0.1–0.2 mm long. Apothecia are rare, with brown discs, and sorediate margins. The predominant secondary compounds are usnic acid, stictic acid, and norstictic acid.

== Habitat and distribution ==
Xanthoparmelia mougeotii typically grows on rocks, particularly ones that are smooth, and on a vertical surface. It is often found in scree fields, rock outcrops, cliffs, on boulders, stones, pebbles or siliceous conglomerates. The lichen has a distribution in temperate locales. It is found in Europe, the United States (including Hawaii), the Dominican Republic, South America, South Africa, and Asia.

== See also ==
- List of Xanthoparmelia species
