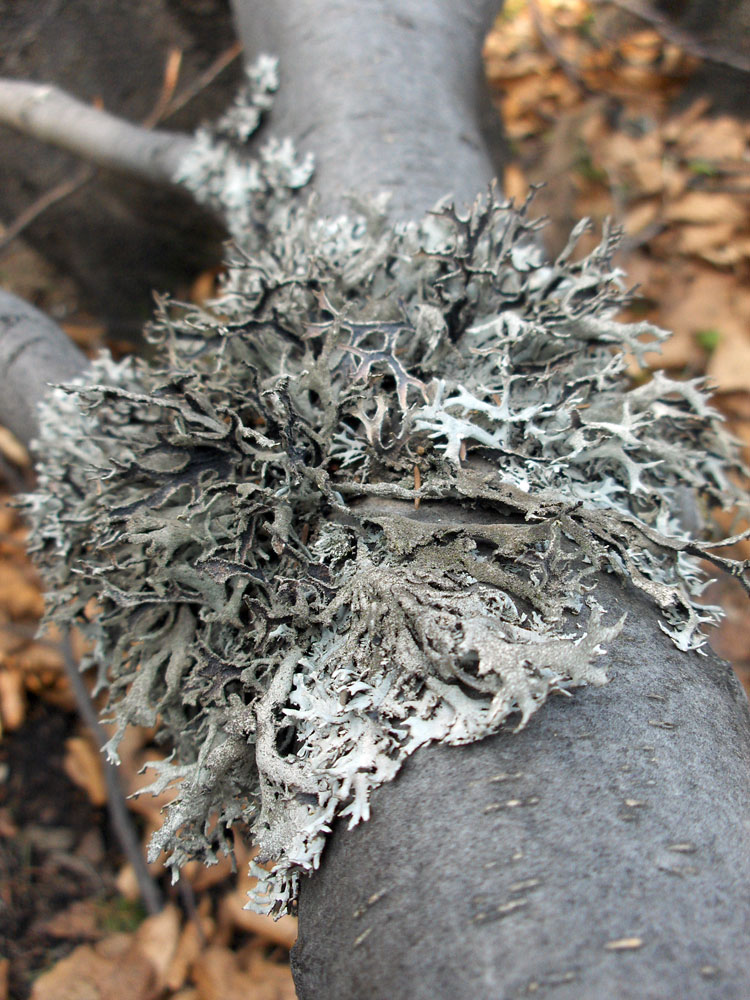

Scientific classification
- Kingdom: Fungi
- Division: Ascomycota
- Class: Lecanoromycetes
- Order: Lecanorales
- Family: Parmeliaceae
- Genus: Pseudevernia
- Species: P. furfuracea

Binomial name
- Pseudevernia furfuracea (L.) Zopf (1903)

Synonyms
- Lichen furfuraceus L. (1753); Borrera furfuracea (L.) Ach.; Evernia furfuracea (L.) W.Mann; Tenorea furfuracea (L.) Tornab.; Physcia furfuracea (L.) DC.; Parmelia furfuracea (L.) Ach.

= Pseudevernia furfuracea =

Species of lichen-forming fungus

Pseudevernia furfuracea, commonly known as tree moss, is a lichenized species of fungus that grows on the bark of firs and pines. The lichen is rather sensitive to air pollution, its presence usually indicating good air conditions in the growing place. The species has numerous human uses, including use in perfume, embalming and in medicine. Large amounts of tree moss is annually processed in France for the perfume industry.

== Description ==
Pseudevernia furfuracea is associated with photobionts from the green algae genus Trebouxia. It reproduces asexually by isidia. The ontogeny of isidia development and its role in CO_{2} gas exchange in P. furfuracea has been investigated. The preferred growing surfaces for P. furfuracea are the so-called "nutrient poor" bark trees, including birch, pine and spruce. While P. furfuracea reproduces mainly through isidia, some specimens rarely develop soralia. When present, the soralia are regularly capitate, substipitate, whitish, and occur on both laminal and marginal surfaces of the thalli.

The species has two morphologically identical varieties that are distinguished by the secondary metabolites they produce: var. ceratea Zopf. produces olivetoric acid and other physodic acids, while var. furfuracea produces physodic but not olivetoric acid. Some authors (e.g., Hale 1968) have separated the chemotypes at the species level, designating the olivetoric acid-containing specimens as Pseudevernia olivetorina, but more recent literature separates them at the varietal level.

== Uses ==
=== Perfumes ===
Large amounts of tree moss (approximately 1900 tons in 1997) are processed in Grasse, France for the perfume industry.

=== Embalming ===
In ancient Egyptian embalming, P. furfuracea was found packed into the body cavity of mummies, although it is not certain whether this was done because of the supposed preservative properties or the aromatic properties of the lichen.

=== Antimicrobial activity ===
Soluble extracts from P. furfuracea var. furfuracea and var. ceratea, as well as specific compounds found therein, have antimicrobial activity against a variety of microorganisms.

=== Medicinal use ===
In Alfacar and Viznar, Andalucia (Spain), P. furfuracea is used for respiratory complaints. The thallus is washed and boiled for a long time to prepare a decoction that is drunk.

Water extracts of this species have been shown to have a potent protective effect on genotoxicity caused by bismuth compounds such as colloidal bismuth subcitrate.

=== Heavy metal sorption ===
Pseudevernia furfuracea has been investigated for its ability to absorb heavy metals from solution. The metal-binding biosorption for copper(II) and nickel(II) was shown to follow the Langmuir and Freundlich isotherm models, suggesting it may have potential as a biosorbent for treatment of heavy metal wastes.

=== Pollution monitors ===
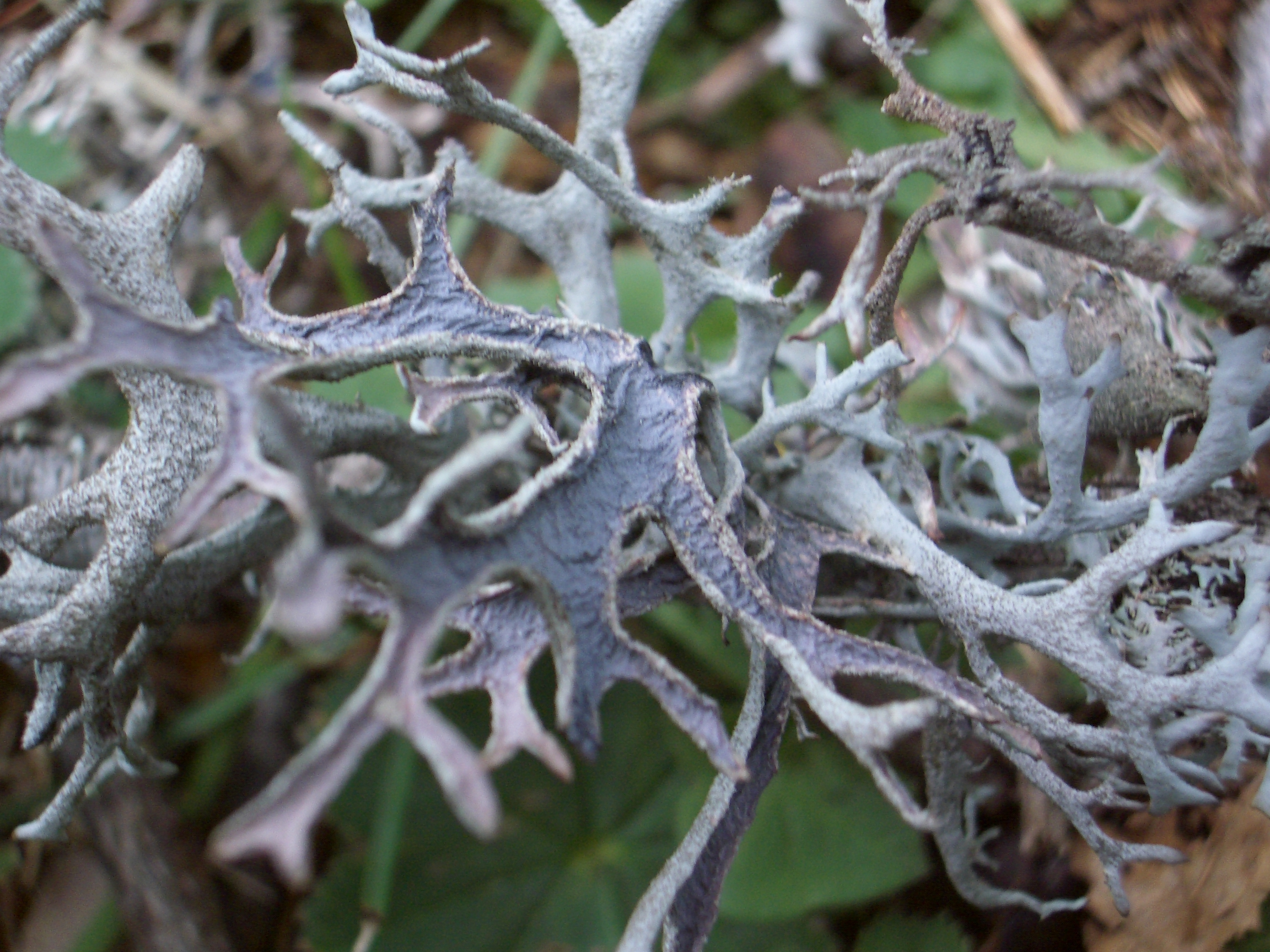
Specimen photographed in Slovenia

Because specimens of P. furfuracea tend to bioaccumulate heavy metals like Cr, Zn, Cd, Pb, Ni, Fe, Mn and Cu proportional to their concentration in airborne particulates, they may be used as a biomonitor of air quality, although it has been noted that both trace metal accumulation and major element accumulation is partly dependent on the hydration level of the specimen. Also, the species is sensitive to ozone concentrations: ozone fumigation results in biophysical, physiological, and structural impairment of specimens. P. furfuracea has also been used to monitor the levels of radionuclides such as Cesium-137 in Austria after the Chernobyl nuclear accident.

== Conservation status ==
In Iceland, P. furfuracea is found in only two locations and is classified as critically endangered (CR).

== Bioactive compounds ==
In addition to the physodic acid mentioned above, P. furfuracea also contains 2-hydroxy-4-methoxy-3,6-dimethyl benzoic acid, atranorin, oxyphysodic acid, and virensic acid. Of these compounds, atranorin showed the highest inhibition of proteolytic enzymes trypsin and porcine pancreatic elastase. Research suggests that the biosynthesis of both atranorin and physodic acid is influenced by the cooperation of epiphytic bacteria.

A number of sterol compounds have been identified from P. furfuracea, including ergosterol peroxide, ergosterol and lichosterol.

== See also ==
- List of lichens named by Carl Linnaeus
