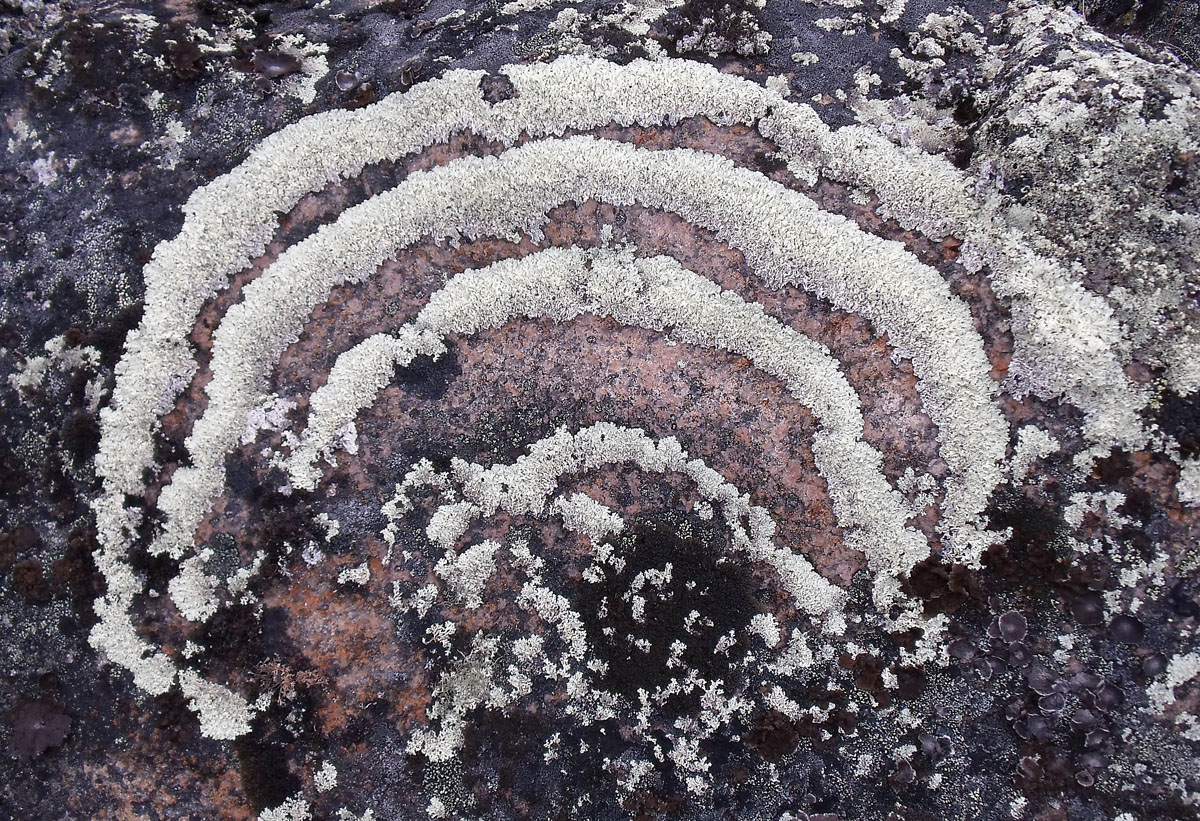

Conservation status
- Secure (NatureServe)

Scientific classification
- Kingdom: Fungi
- Division: Ascomycota
- Class: Lecanoromycetes
- Order: Lecanorales
- Family: Parmeliaceae
- Genus: Arctoparmelia
- Species: A. centrifuga

Binomial name
- Arctoparmelia centrifuga (L.) Hale (1986)

= Arctoparmelia centrifuga =

Species of lichen-forming fungus

Arctoparmelia centrifuga or the concentric ring lichen is a species of ring lichen belonging to the family Parmeliaceae.

Synonym:

- Lichen centrifugus L. (= basionym)

== See also ==
- List of lichens named by Carl Linnaeus
