= Circumpolar distribution =

Species distribution extending around the North or South pole

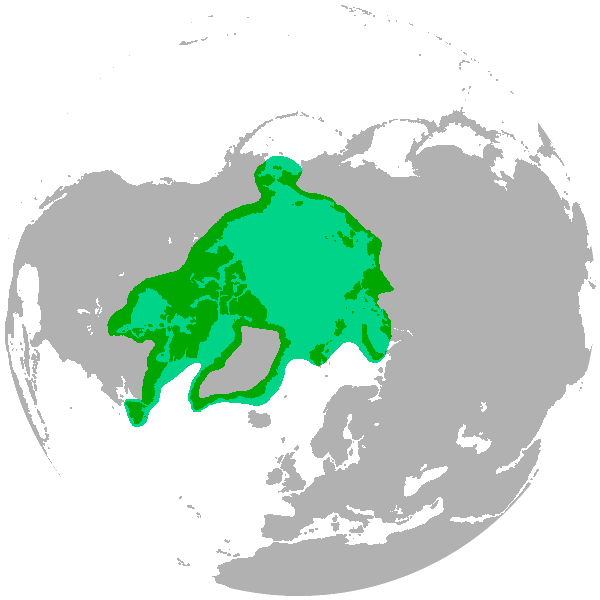
The range of the polar bear encircles the North Pole.

A circumpolar distribution is any range of a taxon that occurs over a wide range of longitudes but only at high latitudes; such a range therefore extends all the way around either the North Pole or the South Pole. Taxa that are also found in isolated high-mountain environments further from the poles are said to have arctic–alpine distributions.

Animals with circumpolar distributions include the reindeer, polar bear, Arctic fox, snowy owl, snow bunting, king eider, gyrfalcon, brent goose and long-tailed skua in the north, and the Weddell seal and Adélie penguin in the south.

Plants with northern circumpolar distributions include Eutrema edwardsii (syn. Draba laevigata), Saxifraga oppositifolia, Persicaria vivipara and Honckenya peploides.
