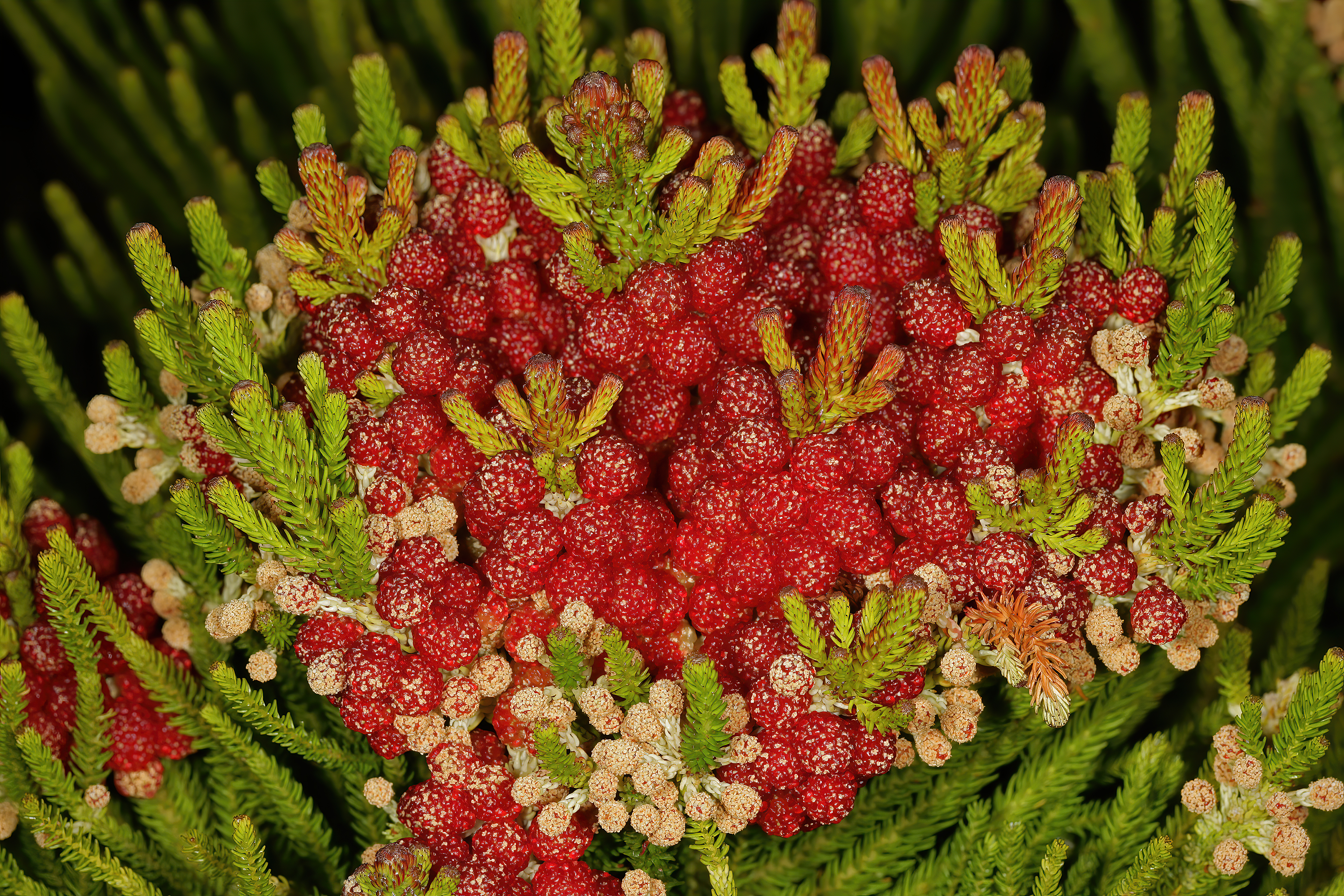

Scientific classification
- Kingdom: Plantae
- Clade: Tracheophytes
- Clade: Angiosperms
- Clade: Eudicots
- Clade: Asterids
- Order: Bruniales
- Family: Bruniaceae
- Genus: Berzelia
- Species: B. alopecuroides

Binomial name
- Berzelia alopecuroides (Thunb.) Sond., (1862)

Synonyms
- Brunia alopecuroides Thunb.

= Berzelia alopecuroides =

Species of plant

Berzelia alopecuroides is a shrub that belongs to the Bruniaceae family. The species is endemic to the Western Cape and is part of the fynbos.

== Gallery ==
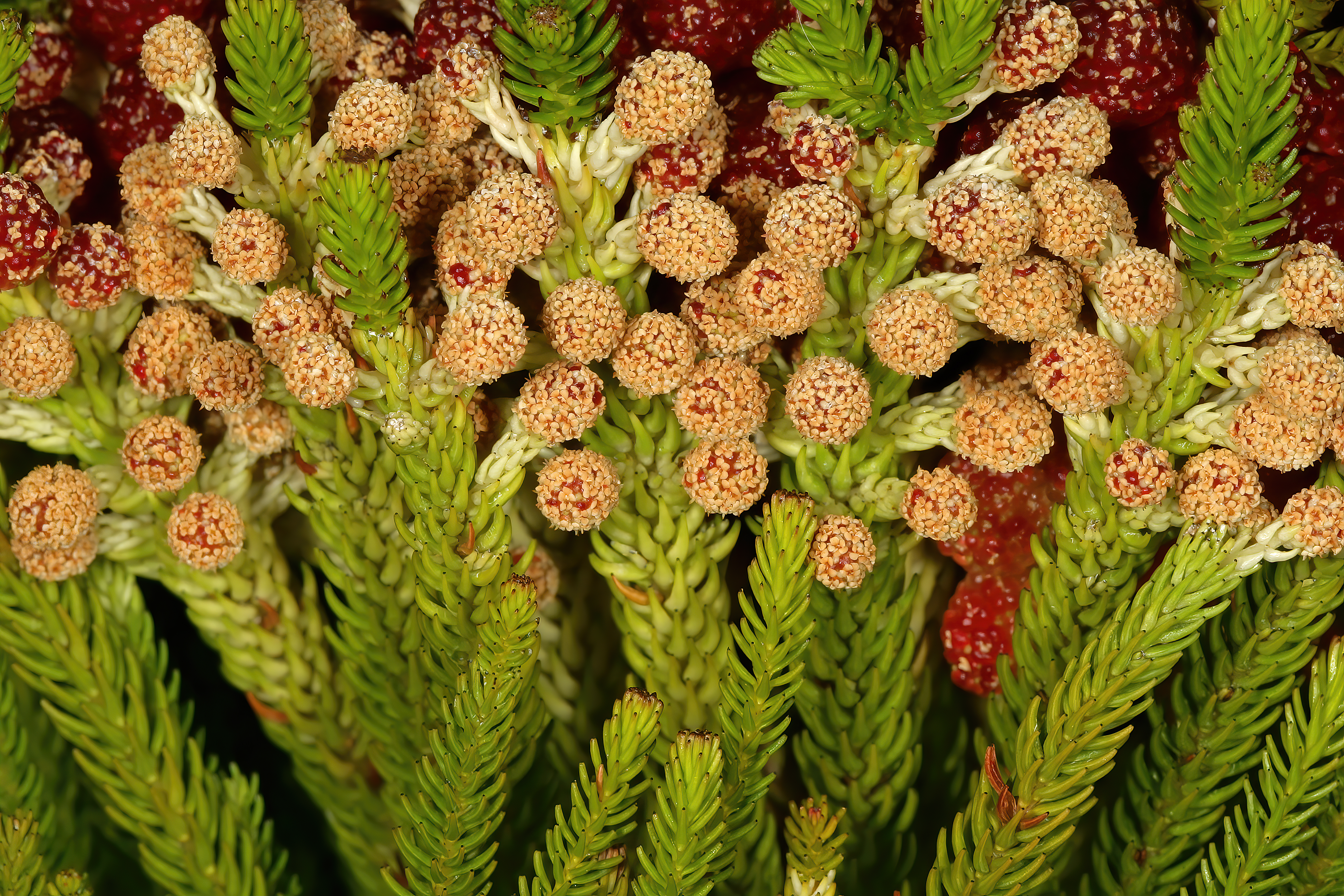

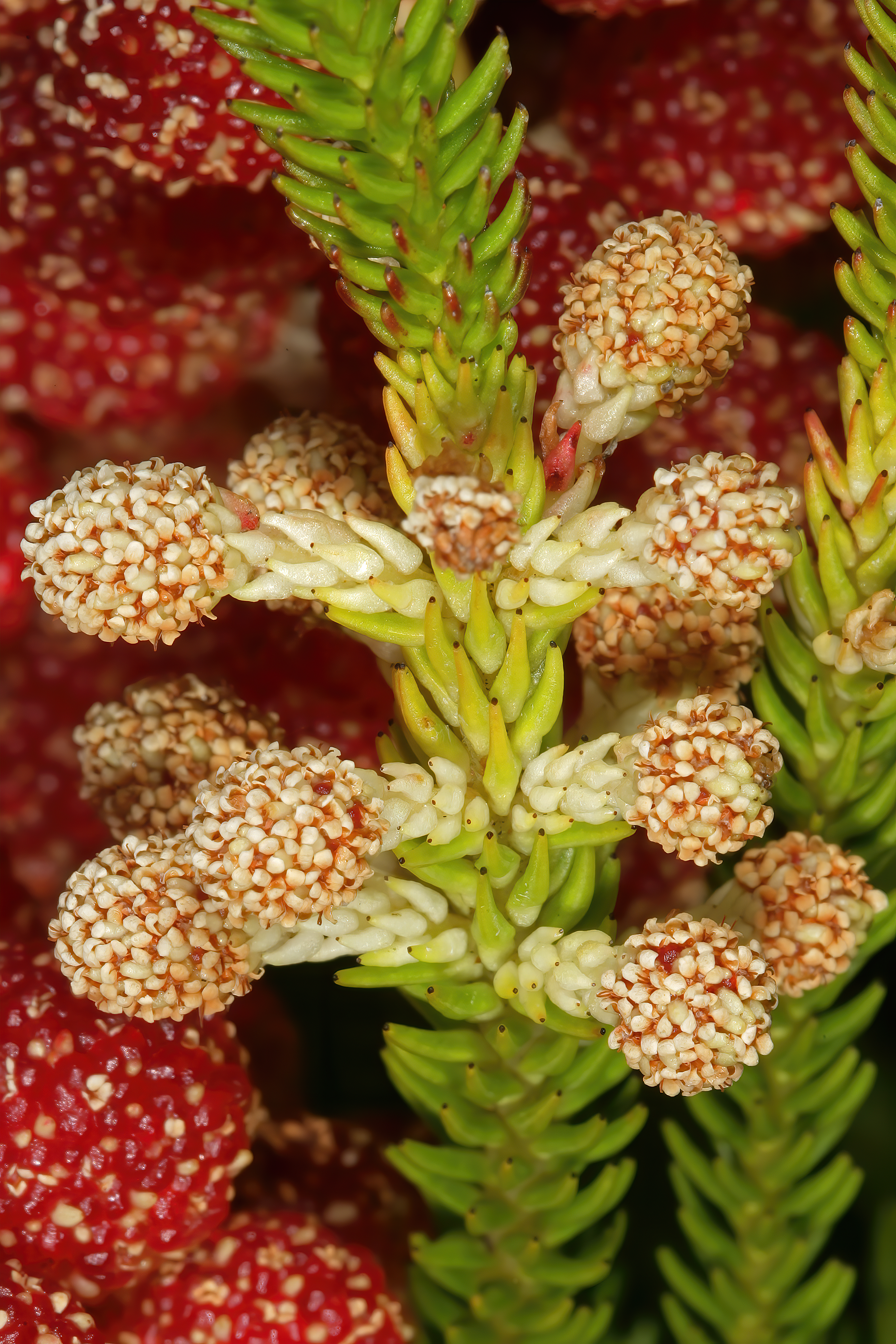

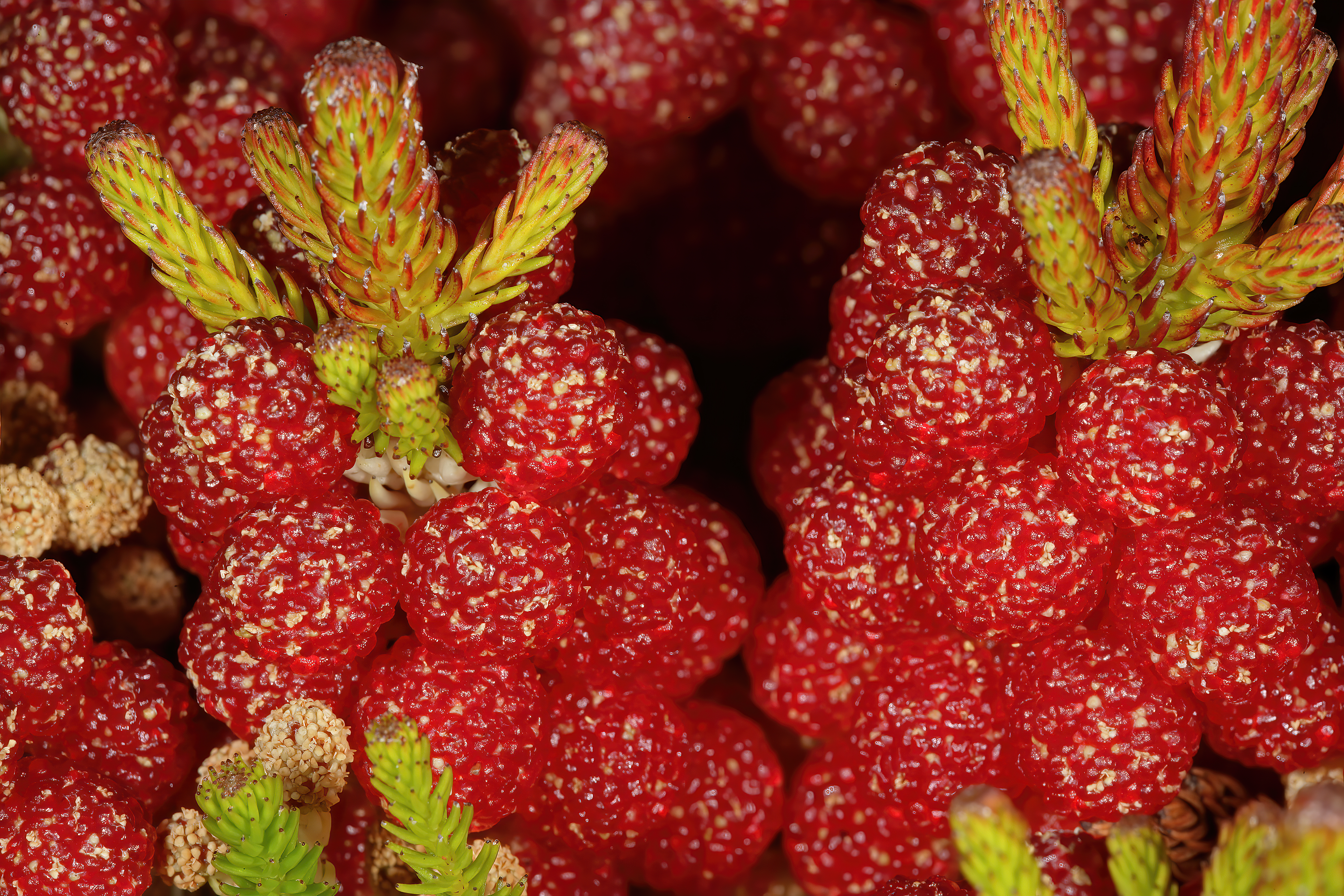

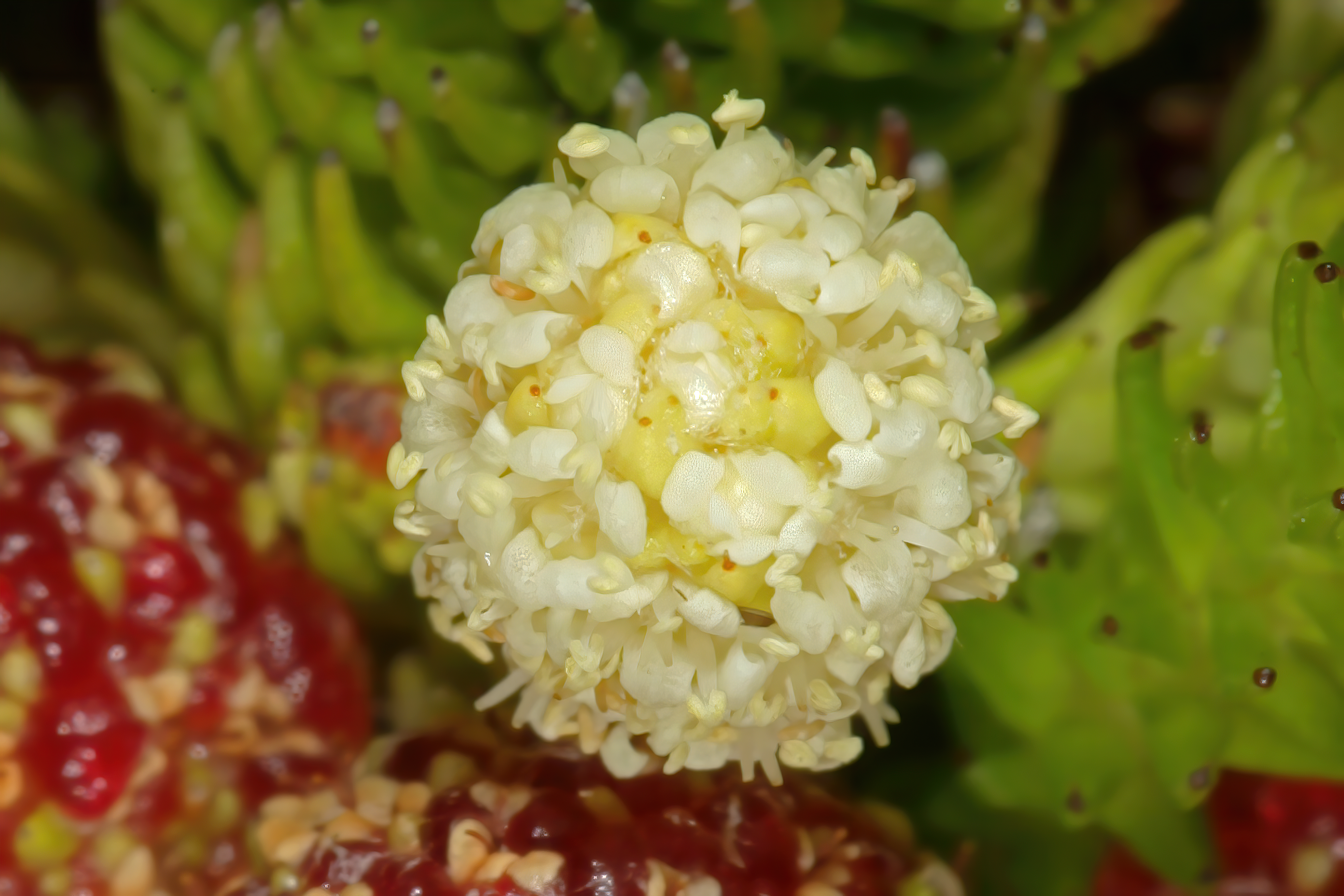

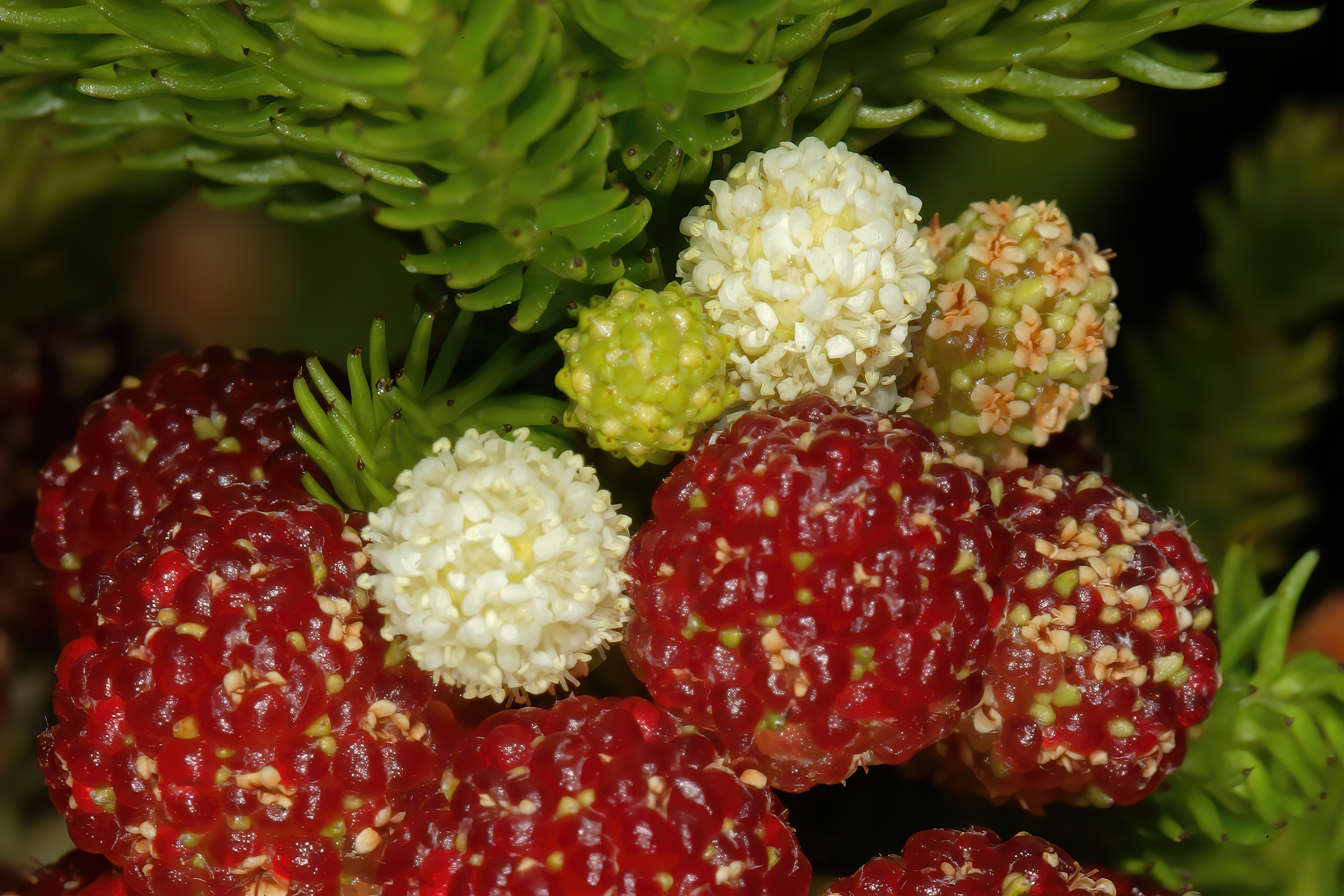

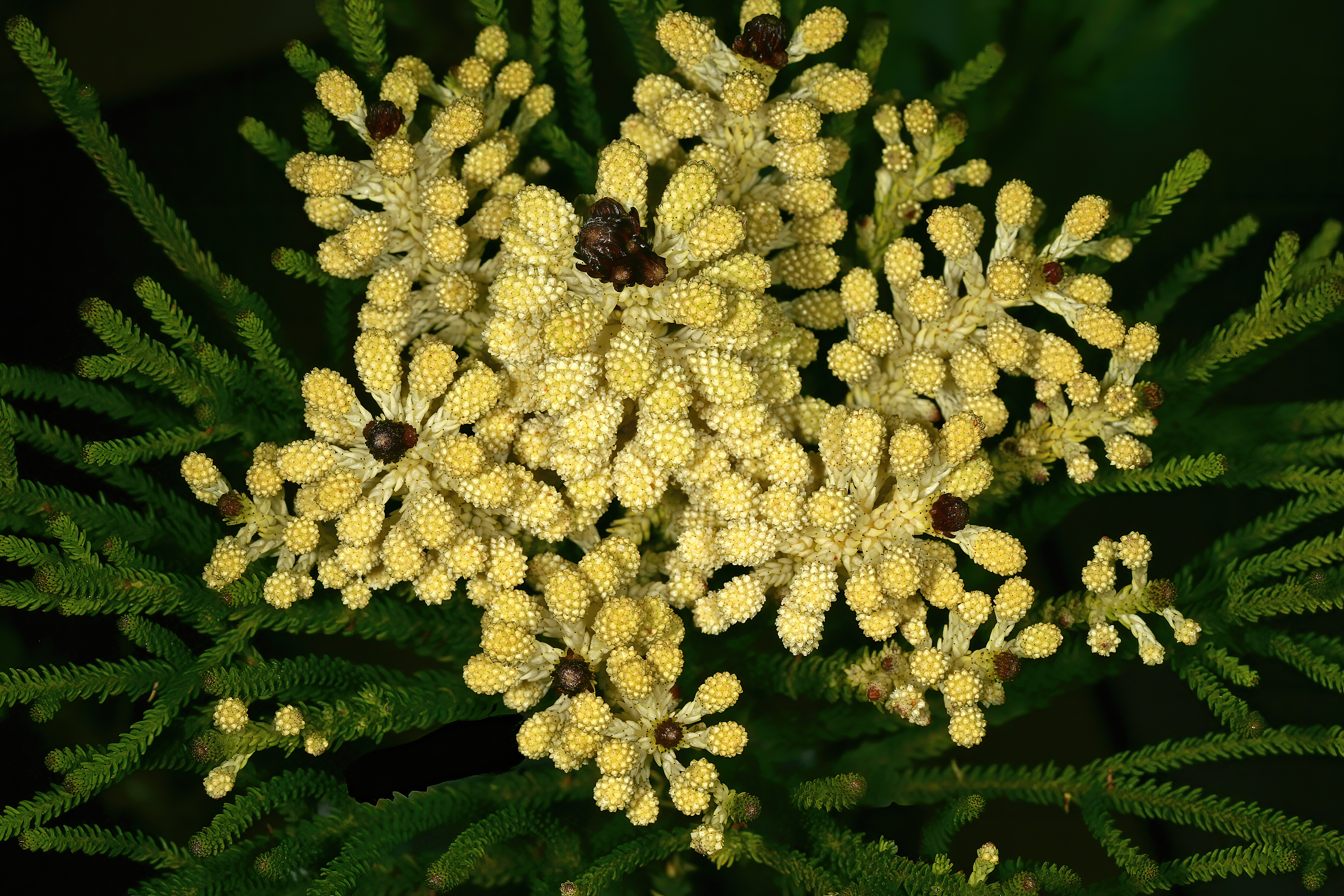
